

331001–331100 

|-bgcolor=#d6d6d6
| 331001 ||  || — || January 26, 2006 || Kitt Peak || Spacewatch || — || align=right | 2.4 km || 
|-id=002 bgcolor=#E9E9E9
| 331002 ||  || — || October 21, 2009 || Catalina || CSS || — || align=right data-sort-value="0.94" | 940 m || 
|-id=003 bgcolor=#E9E9E9
| 331003 ||  || — || October 22, 2009 || Mount Lemmon || Mount Lemmon Survey || — || align=right | 1.8 km || 
|-id=004 bgcolor=#d6d6d6
| 331004 ||  || — || October 18, 2009 || Mount Lemmon || Mount Lemmon Survey || K-2 || align=right | 1.5 km || 
|-id=005 bgcolor=#d6d6d6
| 331005 ||  || — || October 22, 2009 || Mount Lemmon || Mount Lemmon Survey || — || align=right | 3.2 km || 
|-id=006 bgcolor=#E9E9E9
| 331006 ||  || — || October 23, 2009 || Mount Lemmon || Mount Lemmon Survey || — || align=right | 3.4 km || 
|-id=007 bgcolor=#E9E9E9
| 331007 ||  || — || October 24, 2009 || Catalina || CSS || — || align=right | 2.6 km || 
|-id=008 bgcolor=#E9E9E9
| 331008 ||  || — || October 21, 2009 || Catalina || CSS || — || align=right | 2.7 km || 
|-id=009 bgcolor=#d6d6d6
| 331009 ||  || — || October 17, 2009 || Catalina || CSS || HYG || align=right | 2.8 km || 
|-id=010 bgcolor=#E9E9E9
| 331010 ||  || — || October 18, 2009 || Catalina || CSS || — || align=right | 2.5 km || 
|-id=011 bgcolor=#E9E9E9
| 331011 Peccioli ||  ||  || October 26, 2009 || Libbiano || P. Bacci, F. Biasci || — || align=right | 1.4 km || 
|-id=012 bgcolor=#d6d6d6
| 331012 ||  || — || October 23, 2009 || Mount Lemmon || Mount Lemmon Survey || HYG || align=right | 3.2 km || 
|-id=013 bgcolor=#d6d6d6
| 331013 ||  || — || September 27, 2009 || Kitt Peak || Spacewatch || URS || align=right | 4.8 km || 
|-id=014 bgcolor=#d6d6d6
| 331014 ||  || — || October 23, 2009 || Mount Lemmon || Mount Lemmon Survey || — || align=right | 3.1 km || 
|-id=015 bgcolor=#d6d6d6
| 331015 ||  || — || October 18, 2009 || Catalina || CSS || CHA || align=right | 2.5 km || 
|-id=016 bgcolor=#d6d6d6
| 331016 ||  || — || October 23, 2009 || Kitt Peak || Spacewatch || — || align=right | 4.5 km || 
|-id=017 bgcolor=#d6d6d6
| 331017 ||  || — || October 25, 2009 || Kitt Peak || Spacewatch || BRA || align=right | 1.9 km || 
|-id=018 bgcolor=#E9E9E9
| 331018 ||  || — || October 24, 2009 || Catalina || CSS || — || align=right | 2.9 km || 
|-id=019 bgcolor=#d6d6d6
| 331019 ||  || — || October 24, 2009 || Catalina || CSS || — || align=right | 2.9 km || 
|-id=020 bgcolor=#d6d6d6
| 331020 ||  || — || October 26, 2009 || La Sagra || OAM Obs. || EUP || align=right | 6.1 km || 
|-id=021 bgcolor=#E9E9E9
| 331021 ||  || — || October 22, 2009 || Mount Lemmon || Mount Lemmon Survey || AST || align=right | 2.7 km || 
|-id=022 bgcolor=#d6d6d6
| 331022 ||  || — || October 27, 2009 || Kitt Peak || Spacewatch || — || align=right | 2.8 km || 
|-id=023 bgcolor=#fefefe
| 331023 ||  || — || October 19, 2009 || Socorro || LINEAR || FLO || align=right data-sort-value="0.87" | 870 m || 
|-id=024 bgcolor=#E9E9E9
| 331024 ||  || — || October 18, 2009 || Catalina || CSS || — || align=right | 1.1 km || 
|-id=025 bgcolor=#E9E9E9
| 331025 ||  || — || November 8, 2009 || Kitt Peak || Spacewatch || — || align=right | 3.7 km || 
|-id=026 bgcolor=#d6d6d6
| 331026 ||  || — || November 8, 2009 || Catalina || CSS || — || align=right | 4.5 km || 
|-id=027 bgcolor=#d6d6d6
| 331027 ||  || — || November 8, 2009 || Kitt Peak || Spacewatch || — || align=right | 4.3 km || 
|-id=028 bgcolor=#E9E9E9
| 331028 ||  || — || November 8, 2009 || Mount Lemmon || Mount Lemmon Survey || GEF || align=right | 1.2 km || 
|-id=029 bgcolor=#d6d6d6
| 331029 ||  || — || November 8, 2009 || Catalina || CSS || — || align=right | 3.3 km || 
|-id=030 bgcolor=#d6d6d6
| 331030 ||  || — || November 8, 2009 || Catalina || CSS || EOS || align=right | 2.5 km || 
|-id=031 bgcolor=#d6d6d6
| 331031 ||  || — || November 8, 2009 || Kitt Peak || Spacewatch || EMA || align=right | 4.9 km || 
|-id=032 bgcolor=#E9E9E9
| 331032 ||  || — || November 8, 2009 || Catalina || CSS || — || align=right | 1.3 km || 
|-id=033 bgcolor=#d6d6d6
| 331033 ||  || — || November 9, 2009 || Mount Lemmon || Mount Lemmon Survey || — || align=right | 4.7 km || 
|-id=034 bgcolor=#d6d6d6
| 331034 ||  || — || November 9, 2009 || Mount Lemmon || Mount Lemmon Survey || — || align=right | 2.6 km || 
|-id=035 bgcolor=#d6d6d6
| 331035 ||  || — || November 9, 2009 || Mount Lemmon || Mount Lemmon Survey || HYG || align=right | 3.2 km || 
|-id=036 bgcolor=#E9E9E9
| 331036 ||  || — || November 11, 2009 || La Sagra || OAM Obs. || — || align=right | 2.9 km || 
|-id=037 bgcolor=#d6d6d6
| 331037 ||  || — || November 13, 2009 || La Sagra || OAM Obs. || — || align=right | 3.3 km || 
|-id=038 bgcolor=#E9E9E9
| 331038 ||  || — || November 13, 2009 || La Sagra || OAM Obs. || — || align=right | 1.4 km || 
|-id=039 bgcolor=#E9E9E9
| 331039 ||  || — || November 10, 2009 || Mount Lemmon || Mount Lemmon Survey || — || align=right | 2.2 km || 
|-id=040 bgcolor=#E9E9E9
| 331040 ||  || — || September 22, 2009 || Mount Lemmon || Mount Lemmon Survey || MRX || align=right | 1.2 km || 
|-id=041 bgcolor=#E9E9E9
| 331041 ||  || — || November 9, 2009 || Catalina || CSS || — || align=right | 2.4 km || 
|-id=042 bgcolor=#d6d6d6
| 331042 ||  || — || November 8, 2009 || Kitt Peak || Spacewatch || — || align=right | 4.7 km || 
|-id=043 bgcolor=#d6d6d6
| 331043 ||  || — || November 8, 2009 || Kitt Peak || Spacewatch || — || align=right | 3.4 km || 
|-id=044 bgcolor=#E9E9E9
| 331044 ||  || — || November 15, 2009 || Socorro || LINEAR || — || align=right | 2.2 km || 
|-id=045 bgcolor=#E9E9E9
| 331045 ||  || — || November 11, 2009 || Mount Lemmon || Mount Lemmon Survey || — || align=right | 1.3 km || 
|-id=046 bgcolor=#d6d6d6
| 331046 ||  || — || November 8, 2009 || Catalina || CSS || — || align=right | 4.0 km || 
|-id=047 bgcolor=#d6d6d6
| 331047 ||  || — || November 10, 2009 || Kitt Peak || Spacewatch || EOS || align=right | 3.7 km || 
|-id=048 bgcolor=#d6d6d6
| 331048 ||  || — || November 9, 2009 || Catalina || CSS || URS || align=right | 4.3 km || 
|-id=049 bgcolor=#d6d6d6
| 331049 ||  || — || November 10, 2009 || Kitt Peak || Spacewatch || EOS || align=right | 2.3 km || 
|-id=050 bgcolor=#C2FFFF
| 331050 ||  || — || November 8, 2009 || Mount Lemmon || Mount Lemmon Survey || L4ERY || align=right | 13 km || 
|-id=051 bgcolor=#E9E9E9
| 331051 ||  || — || November 30, 2005 || Kitt Peak || Spacewatch || PAD || align=right | 2.3 km || 
|-id=052 bgcolor=#d6d6d6
| 331052 ||  || — || November 9, 2009 || Catalina || CSS || — || align=right | 3.3 km || 
|-id=053 bgcolor=#d6d6d6
| 331053 ||  || — || November 11, 2009 || Mount Lemmon || Mount Lemmon Survey || — || align=right | 2.4 km || 
|-id=054 bgcolor=#d6d6d6
| 331054 ||  || — || October 25, 2009 || Mount Lemmon || Mount Lemmon Survey || — || align=right | 4.5 km || 
|-id=055 bgcolor=#fefefe
| 331055 || 2009 WJ || — || November 16, 2009 || Mayhill || iTelescope Obs. || V || align=right data-sort-value="0.70" | 700 m || 
|-id=056 bgcolor=#d6d6d6
| 331056 || 2009 WX || — || November 17, 2009 || Tzec Maun || D. Chestnov, A. Novichonok || CHA || align=right | 2.6 km || 
|-id=057 bgcolor=#E9E9E9
| 331057 ||  || — || October 26, 2009 || Kitt Peak || Spacewatch || — || align=right | 1.9 km || 
|-id=058 bgcolor=#d6d6d6
| 331058 ||  || — || November 18, 2009 || Marly || P. Kocher || — || align=right | 3.5 km || 
|-id=059 bgcolor=#d6d6d6
| 331059 ||  || — || November 17, 2009 || Socorro || LINEAR || — || align=right | 5.4 km || 
|-id=060 bgcolor=#d6d6d6
| 331060 ||  || — || April 18, 2007 || Mount Lemmon || Mount Lemmon Survey || CHA || align=right | 2.4 km || 
|-id=061 bgcolor=#E9E9E9
| 331061 ||  || — || October 23, 2009 || Mount Lemmon || Mount Lemmon Survey || — || align=right | 1.4 km || 
|-id=062 bgcolor=#E9E9E9
| 331062 ||  || — || November 16, 2009 || La Sagra || OAM Obs. || — || align=right | 1.9 km || 
|-id=063 bgcolor=#E9E9E9
| 331063 ||  || — || November 18, 2009 || Kachina || J. Hobart || — || align=right | 1.8 km || 
|-id=064 bgcolor=#E9E9E9
| 331064 ||  || — || November 21, 2009 || Mayhill || A. Lowe || — || align=right | 2.4 km || 
|-id=065 bgcolor=#d6d6d6
| 331065 ||  || — || November 16, 2009 || Kitt Peak || Spacewatch || KOR || align=right | 1.4 km || 
|-id=066 bgcolor=#E9E9E9
| 331066 ||  || — || November 16, 2009 || Kitt Peak || Spacewatch || — || align=right | 1.6 km || 
|-id=067 bgcolor=#d6d6d6
| 331067 ||  || — || November 17, 2009 || Kitt Peak || Spacewatch || EOS || align=right | 2.1 km || 
|-id=068 bgcolor=#d6d6d6
| 331068 ||  || — || October 25, 2009 || Kitt Peak || Spacewatch || — || align=right | 3.6 km || 
|-id=069 bgcolor=#d6d6d6
| 331069 ||  || — || November 19, 2009 || Kitt Peak || Spacewatch || URS || align=right | 5.8 km || 
|-id=070 bgcolor=#d6d6d6
| 331070 ||  || — || November 20, 2009 || Mount Lemmon || Mount Lemmon Survey || — || align=right | 3.8 km || 
|-id=071 bgcolor=#d6d6d6
| 331071 ||  || — || November 19, 2009 || La Sagra || OAM Obs. || — || align=right | 2.7 km || 
|-id=072 bgcolor=#E9E9E9
| 331072 ||  || — || September 7, 2004 || Kitt Peak || Spacewatch || HEN || align=right | 1.1 km || 
|-id=073 bgcolor=#d6d6d6
| 331073 ||  || — || September 30, 2003 || Kitt Peak || Spacewatch || — || align=right | 3.2 km || 
|-id=074 bgcolor=#d6d6d6
| 331074 ||  || — || October 23, 2009 || Mount Lemmon || Mount Lemmon Survey || KOR || align=right | 1.4 km || 
|-id=075 bgcolor=#d6d6d6
| 331075 ||  || — || November 18, 2009 || Kitt Peak || Spacewatch || — || align=right | 2.7 km || 
|-id=076 bgcolor=#d6d6d6
| 331076 ||  || — || November 18, 2009 || Kitt Peak || Spacewatch || EOS || align=right | 2.1 km || 
|-id=077 bgcolor=#d6d6d6
| 331077 ||  || — || November 18, 2009 || Kitt Peak || Spacewatch || EOS || align=right | 2.1 km || 
|-id=078 bgcolor=#d6d6d6
| 331078 ||  || — || November 19, 2009 || La Sagra || OAM Obs. || EOS || align=right | 2.4 km || 
|-id=079 bgcolor=#d6d6d6
| 331079 ||  || — || November 20, 2009 || Mount Lemmon || Mount Lemmon Survey || — || align=right | 2.5 km || 
|-id=080 bgcolor=#d6d6d6
| 331080 ||  || — || November 21, 2009 || Kitt Peak || Spacewatch || — || align=right | 2.6 km || 
|-id=081 bgcolor=#E9E9E9
| 331081 ||  || — || November 22, 2009 || Kitt Peak || Spacewatch || AGN || align=right | 1.4 km || 
|-id=082 bgcolor=#d6d6d6
| 331082 ||  || — || November 22, 2009 || Kitt Peak || Spacewatch || — || align=right | 3.1 km || 
|-id=083 bgcolor=#d6d6d6
| 331083 ||  || — || November 17, 2009 || Mount Lemmon || Mount Lemmon Survey || — || align=right | 3.2 km || 
|-id=084 bgcolor=#fefefe
| 331084 ||  || — || March 16, 2004 || Kitt Peak || Spacewatch || — || align=right | 1.0 km || 
|-id=085 bgcolor=#E9E9E9
| 331085 ||  || — || November 23, 2009 || Mount Lemmon || Mount Lemmon Survey || PAD || align=right | 1.7 km || 
|-id=086 bgcolor=#d6d6d6
| 331086 ||  || — || November 18, 2009 || Mount Lemmon || Mount Lemmon Survey || CHA || align=right | 3.1 km || 
|-id=087 bgcolor=#E9E9E9
| 331087 ||  || — || November 19, 2009 || Mount Lemmon || Mount Lemmon Survey || HOF || align=right | 3.2 km || 
|-id=088 bgcolor=#d6d6d6
| 331088 ||  || — || November 21, 2009 || Kitt Peak || Spacewatch || — || align=right | 3.9 km || 
|-id=089 bgcolor=#d6d6d6
| 331089 ||  || — || November 22, 2009 || Kitt Peak || Spacewatch || — || align=right | 2.9 km || 
|-id=090 bgcolor=#E9E9E9
| 331090 ||  || — || November 22, 2009 || Mount Lemmon || Mount Lemmon Survey || — || align=right | 4.8 km || 
|-id=091 bgcolor=#d6d6d6
| 331091 ||  || — || November 23, 2009 || Kitt Peak || Spacewatch || — || align=right | 3.5 km || 
|-id=092 bgcolor=#d6d6d6
| 331092 ||  || — || November 23, 2009 || Mount Lemmon || Mount Lemmon Survey || EOS || align=right | 2.2 km || 
|-id=093 bgcolor=#d6d6d6
| 331093 ||  || — || November 23, 2009 || Kitt Peak || Spacewatch || — || align=right | 4.5 km || 
|-id=094 bgcolor=#E9E9E9
| 331094 ||  || — || November 24, 2009 || Mount Lemmon || Mount Lemmon Survey || — || align=right | 2.4 km || 
|-id=095 bgcolor=#d6d6d6
| 331095 ||  || — || November 24, 2009 || Mount Lemmon || Mount Lemmon Survey || — || align=right | 3.0 km || 
|-id=096 bgcolor=#d6d6d6
| 331096 ||  || — || November 24, 2009 || Mount Lemmon || Mount Lemmon Survey || — || align=right | 3.1 km || 
|-id=097 bgcolor=#d6d6d6
| 331097 ||  || — || October 18, 2009 || Mount Lemmon || Mount Lemmon Survey || TEL || align=right | 5.1 km || 
|-id=098 bgcolor=#d6d6d6
| 331098 ||  || — || November 9, 2009 || Kitt Peak || Spacewatch || — || align=right | 3.0 km || 
|-id=099 bgcolor=#d6d6d6
| 331099 ||  || — || November 26, 2009 || Mount Lemmon || Mount Lemmon Survey || EOS || align=right | 4.6 km || 
|-id=100 bgcolor=#E9E9E9
| 331100 ||  || — || October 23, 2009 || Kitt Peak || Spacewatch || — || align=right | 1.8 km || 
|}

331101–331200 

|-bgcolor=#d6d6d6
| 331101 ||  || — || November 19, 2009 || Mount Lemmon || Mount Lemmon Survey || — || align=right | 4.0 km || 
|-id=102 bgcolor=#d6d6d6
| 331102 ||  || — || November 20, 2009 || Kitt Peak || Spacewatch || — || align=right | 3.7 km || 
|-id=103 bgcolor=#d6d6d6
| 331103 ||  || — || November 20, 2009 || Kitt Peak || Spacewatch || — || align=right | 3.9 km || 
|-id=104 bgcolor=#d6d6d6
| 331104 ||  || — || December 10, 2009 || Mayhill || A. Lowe || — || align=right | 4.5 km || 
|-id=105 bgcolor=#fefefe
| 331105 Giselher ||  ||  || December 13, 2009 || Sonoita || R. Kracht || — || align=right data-sort-value="0.92" | 920 m || 
|-id=106 bgcolor=#d6d6d6
| 331106 ||  || — || November 27, 2009 || Mount Lemmon || Mount Lemmon Survey || — || align=right | 3.7 km || 
|-id=107 bgcolor=#C2FFFF
| 331107 ||  || — || November 24, 2009 || Catalina || CSS || L4 || align=right | 13 km || 
|-id=108 bgcolor=#d6d6d6
| 331108 ||  || — || September 24, 2008 || Mount Lemmon || Mount Lemmon Survey || — || align=right | 4.4 km || 
|-id=109 bgcolor=#fefefe
| 331109 ||  || — || July 14, 2010 || WISE || WISE || — || align=right | 2.6 km || 
|-id=110 bgcolor=#E9E9E9
| 331110 ||  || — || March 5, 2008 || Mount Lemmon || Mount Lemmon Survey || KON || align=right | 2.3 km || 
|-id=111 bgcolor=#fefefe
| 331111 ||  || — || February 25, 2006 || Catalina || CSS || H || align=right data-sort-value="0.80" | 800 m || 
|-id=112 bgcolor=#fefefe
| 331112 ||  || — || October 20, 2007 || Mount Lemmon || Mount Lemmon Survey || — || align=right data-sort-value="0.69" | 690 m || 
|-id=113 bgcolor=#E9E9E9
| 331113 ||  || — || February 7, 2008 || Kitt Peak || Spacewatch || AGN || align=right | 1.5 km || 
|-id=114 bgcolor=#fefefe
| 331114 ||  || — || December 16, 2007 || Mount Lemmon || Mount Lemmon Survey || — || align=right | 1.0 km || 
|-id=115 bgcolor=#fefefe
| 331115 ||  || — || September 28, 2003 || Socorro || LINEAR || — || align=right data-sort-value="0.89" | 890 m || 
|-id=116 bgcolor=#fefefe
| 331116 ||  || — || March 26, 2001 || Anderson Mesa || LONEOS || PHO || align=right | 1.2 km || 
|-id=117 bgcolor=#fefefe
| 331117 ||  || — || October 8, 2010 || Catalina || CSS || — || align=right data-sort-value="0.78" | 780 m || 
|-id=118 bgcolor=#fefefe
| 331118 ||  || — || September 14, 2007 || Catalina || CSS || H || align=right data-sort-value="0.66" | 660 m || 
|-id=119 bgcolor=#fefefe
| 331119 ||  || — || October 18, 2003 || Kitt Peak || Spacewatch || — || align=right data-sort-value="0.80" | 800 m || 
|-id=120 bgcolor=#fefefe
| 331120 ||  || — || November 12, 1996 || Prescott || P. G. Comba || — || align=right data-sort-value="0.98" | 980 m || 
|-id=121 bgcolor=#E9E9E9
| 331121 ||  || — || August 29, 2005 || Kitt Peak || Spacewatch || — || align=right | 1.7 km || 
|-id=122 bgcolor=#fefefe
| 331122 ||  || — || October 19, 2003 || Kitt Peak || Spacewatch || — || align=right data-sort-value="0.84" | 840 m || 
|-id=123 bgcolor=#E9E9E9
| 331123 ||  || — || December 13, 2001 || Palomar || NEAT || — || align=right | 2.6 km || 
|-id=124 bgcolor=#E9E9E9
| 331124 ||  || — || March 29, 2008 || Kitt Peak || Spacewatch || — || align=right | 1.5 km || 
|-id=125 bgcolor=#E9E9E9
| 331125 ||  || — || September 16, 2010 || Mount Lemmon || Mount Lemmon Survey || JUN || align=right | 1.0 km || 
|-id=126 bgcolor=#E9E9E9
| 331126 ||  || — || January 17, 2007 || Catalina || CSS || — || align=right | 1.6 km || 
|-id=127 bgcolor=#E9E9E9
| 331127 ||  || — || September 18, 2010 || Mount Lemmon || Mount Lemmon Survey || — || align=right | 2.0 km || 
|-id=128 bgcolor=#fefefe
| 331128 ||  || — || September 28, 2006 || Kitt Peak || Spacewatch || — || align=right data-sort-value="0.79" | 790 m || 
|-id=129 bgcolor=#E9E9E9
| 331129 ||  || — || November 2, 2006 || Mount Lemmon || Mount Lemmon Survey || — || align=right data-sort-value="0.94" | 940 m || 
|-id=130 bgcolor=#E9E9E9
| 331130 ||  || — || February 19, 2003 || Palomar || NEAT || JUN || align=right | 1.6 km || 
|-id=131 bgcolor=#d6d6d6
| 331131 ||  || — || December 1, 2005 || Mount Lemmon || Mount Lemmon Survey || — || align=right | 2.9 km || 
|-id=132 bgcolor=#fefefe
| 331132 ||  || — || November 14, 2007 || Mount Lemmon || Mount Lemmon Survey || MAS || align=right data-sort-value="0.89" | 890 m || 
|-id=133 bgcolor=#fefefe
| 331133 ||  || — || September 19, 2003 || Palomar || NEAT || FLO || align=right data-sort-value="0.80" | 800 m || 
|-id=134 bgcolor=#fefefe
| 331134 ||  || — || November 10, 2006 || Kitt Peak || Spacewatch || — || align=right data-sort-value="0.86" | 860 m || 
|-id=135 bgcolor=#d6d6d6
| 331135 ||  || — || December 4, 2005 || Mount Lemmon || Mount Lemmon Survey || KOR || align=right | 1.3 km || 
|-id=136 bgcolor=#fefefe
| 331136 ||  || — || May 11, 1996 || Kitt Peak || Spacewatch || — || align=right data-sort-value="0.81" | 810 m || 
|-id=137 bgcolor=#fefefe
| 331137 ||  || — || February 26, 2008 || Bisei SG Center || BATTeRS || — || align=right data-sort-value="0.85" | 850 m || 
|-id=138 bgcolor=#E9E9E9
| 331138 ||  || — || December 27, 2006 || Catalina || CSS || JUN || align=right | 1.3 km || 
|-id=139 bgcolor=#FA8072
| 331139 ||  || — || March 9, 2004 || Palomar || NEAT || H || align=right | 1.2 km || 
|-id=140 bgcolor=#fefefe
| 331140 ||  || — || November 20, 2003 || Socorro || LINEAR || — || align=right data-sort-value="0.89" | 890 m || 
|-id=141 bgcolor=#fefefe
| 331141 ||  || — || May 9, 2002 || Palomar || NEAT || — || align=right data-sort-value="0.95" | 950 m || 
|-id=142 bgcolor=#E9E9E9
| 331142 ||  || — || July 26, 2005 || Palomar || NEAT || — || align=right | 2.7 km || 
|-id=143 bgcolor=#fefefe
| 331143 ||  || — || December 20, 2007 || Kitt Peak || Spacewatch || FLO || align=right data-sort-value="0.42" | 420 m || 
|-id=144 bgcolor=#E9E9E9
| 331144 ||  || — || May 16, 2005 || Mount Lemmon || Mount Lemmon Survey || — || align=right | 1.2 km || 
|-id=145 bgcolor=#fefefe
| 331145 ||  || — || September 9, 2007 || Siding Spring || SSS || H || align=right data-sort-value="0.72" | 720 m || 
|-id=146 bgcolor=#fefefe
| 331146 ||  || — || March 6, 2008 || Mount Lemmon || Mount Lemmon Survey || — || align=right data-sort-value="0.87" | 870 m || 
|-id=147 bgcolor=#d6d6d6
| 331147 ||  || — || December 28, 2005 || Mount Lemmon || Mount Lemmon Survey || — || align=right | 2.5 km || 
|-id=148 bgcolor=#E9E9E9
| 331148 ||  || — || November 21, 2006 || Mount Lemmon || Mount Lemmon Survey || EUN || align=right | 1.5 km || 
|-id=149 bgcolor=#d6d6d6
| 331149 ||  || — || March 13, 2007 || Mount Lemmon || Mount Lemmon Survey || CHA || align=right | 2.3 km || 
|-id=150 bgcolor=#E9E9E9
| 331150 ||  || — || September 11, 2005 || Kitt Peak || Spacewatch || — || align=right | 1.5 km || 
|-id=151 bgcolor=#fefefe
| 331151 ||  || — || November 30, 2010 || Mount Lemmon || Mount Lemmon Survey || V || align=right data-sort-value="0.71" | 710 m || 
|-id=152 bgcolor=#E9E9E9
| 331152 ||  || — || March 15, 2007 || Mount Lemmon || Mount Lemmon Survey || — || align=right | 1.6 km || 
|-id=153 bgcolor=#E9E9E9
| 331153 ||  || — || October 21, 2006 || Mount Lemmon || Mount Lemmon Survey || RAF || align=right data-sort-value="0.90" | 900 m || 
|-id=154 bgcolor=#E9E9E9
| 331154 ||  || — || April 26, 2003 || Haleakala || NEAT || JUN || align=right | 1.3 km || 
|-id=155 bgcolor=#d6d6d6
| 331155 ||  || — || September 16, 2004 || Siding Spring || SSS || — || align=right | 3.4 km || 
|-id=156 bgcolor=#E9E9E9
| 331156 ||  || — || January 27, 2003 || Anderson Mesa || LONEOS || — || align=right | 1.2 km || 
|-id=157 bgcolor=#d6d6d6
| 331157 ||  || — || October 31, 2010 || Mount Lemmon || Mount Lemmon Survey || — || align=right | 3.4 km || 
|-id=158 bgcolor=#E9E9E9
| 331158 ||  || — || September 28, 2006 || Mount Lemmon || Mount Lemmon Survey || RAF || align=right | 1.1 km || 
|-id=159 bgcolor=#fefefe
| 331159 ||  || — || October 4, 2006 || Mount Lemmon || Mount Lemmon Survey || — || align=right data-sort-value="0.99" | 990 m || 
|-id=160 bgcolor=#fefefe
| 331160 ||  || — || September 19, 2006 || Kitt Peak || Spacewatch || — || align=right data-sort-value="0.66" | 660 m || 
|-id=161 bgcolor=#E9E9E9
| 331161 ||  || — || April 29, 2008 || Kitt Peak || Spacewatch || — || align=right | 1.7 km || 
|-id=162 bgcolor=#E9E9E9
| 331162 ||  || — || December 14, 2006 || Socorro || LINEAR || — || align=right | 1.5 km || 
|-id=163 bgcolor=#E9E9E9
| 331163 ||  || — || December 8, 2002 || Palomar || NEAT || — || align=right | 1.2 km || 
|-id=164 bgcolor=#fefefe
| 331164 ||  || — || October 5, 2003 || Kitt Peak || Spacewatch || — || align=right data-sort-value="0.77" | 770 m || 
|-id=165 bgcolor=#d6d6d6
| 331165 ||  || — || June 10, 2008 || Kitt Peak || Spacewatch || TIR || align=right | 3.5 km || 
|-id=166 bgcolor=#d6d6d6
| 331166 ||  || — || October 13, 2004 || Anderson Mesa || LONEOS || — || align=right | 3.6 km || 
|-id=167 bgcolor=#d6d6d6
| 331167 ||  || — || April 7, 2006 || Anderson Mesa || LONEOS || EUP || align=right | 4.7 km || 
|-id=168 bgcolor=#d6d6d6
| 331168 ||  || — || February 1, 2006 || Catalina || CSS || — || align=right | 3.6 km || 
|-id=169 bgcolor=#fefefe
| 331169 ||  || — || March 15, 2004 || Kitt Peak || Spacewatch || SUL || align=right | 2.2 km || 
|-id=170 bgcolor=#d6d6d6
| 331170 ||  || — || January 5, 2011 || Catalina || CSS || HYG || align=right | 3.5 km || 
|-id=171 bgcolor=#d6d6d6
| 331171 ||  || — || March 29, 2001 || Haleakala || NEAT || — || align=right | 3.7 km || 
|-id=172 bgcolor=#d6d6d6
| 331172 ||  || — || March 9, 2002 || Kitt Peak || Spacewatch || KOR || align=right | 1.3 km || 
|-id=173 bgcolor=#d6d6d6
| 331173 ||  || — || March 23, 2006 || Catalina || CSS || — || align=right | 3.5 km || 
|-id=174 bgcolor=#E9E9E9
| 331174 ||  || — || January 22, 2002 || Kitt Peak || Spacewatch || AEO || align=right | 1.2 km || 
|-id=175 bgcolor=#fefefe
| 331175 ||  || — || October 22, 2006 || Mount Lemmon || Mount Lemmon Survey || — || align=right | 1.1 km || 
|-id=176 bgcolor=#E9E9E9
| 331176 ||  || — || September 30, 2005 || Anderson Mesa || LONEOS || — || align=right | 1.6 km || 
|-id=177 bgcolor=#fefefe
| 331177 ||  || — || December 12, 2006 || Kitt Peak || Spacewatch || — || align=right | 1.1 km || 
|-id=178 bgcolor=#E9E9E9
| 331178 ||  || — || April 5, 2003 || Anderson Mesa || LONEOS || — || align=right | 2.4 km || 
|-id=179 bgcolor=#fefefe
| 331179 ||  || — || February 11, 2008 || Mount Lemmon || Mount Lemmon Survey || — || align=right data-sort-value="0.90" | 900 m || 
|-id=180 bgcolor=#E9E9E9
| 331180 ||  || — || February 23, 2007 || Catalina || CSS || EUN || align=right | 1.4 km || 
|-id=181 bgcolor=#d6d6d6
| 331181 ||  || — || January 26, 2006 || Mount Lemmon || Mount Lemmon Survey || EOS || align=right | 2.0 km || 
|-id=182 bgcolor=#E9E9E9
| 331182 ||  || — || October 26, 2009 || Mount Lemmon || Mount Lemmon Survey || PAD || align=right | 1.9 km || 
|-id=183 bgcolor=#d6d6d6
| 331183 ||  || — || February 27, 2006 || Kitt Peak || Spacewatch || THM || align=right | 2.6 km || 
|-id=184 bgcolor=#E9E9E9
| 331184 ||  || — || March 19, 2007 || Mount Lemmon || Mount Lemmon Survey || — || align=right | 2.8 km || 
|-id=185 bgcolor=#E9E9E9
| 331185 ||  || — || November 1, 2005 || Mount Lemmon || Mount Lemmon Survey || — || align=right | 2.1 km || 
|-id=186 bgcolor=#E9E9E9
| 331186 ||  || — || November 1, 2005 || Mount Lemmon || Mount Lemmon Survey || — || align=right | 1.6 km || 
|-id=187 bgcolor=#E9E9E9
| 331187 ||  || — || October 30, 2006 || Mount Lemmon || Mount Lemmon Survey || BAR || align=right | 1.4 km || 
|-id=188 bgcolor=#E9E9E9
| 331188 ||  || — || February 4, 2003 || Kitt Peak || Spacewatch || — || align=right | 1.1 km || 
|-id=189 bgcolor=#d6d6d6
| 331189 ||  || — || November 18, 2009 || Mount Lemmon || Mount Lemmon Survey || HYG || align=right | 3.2 km || 
|-id=190 bgcolor=#fefefe
| 331190 ||  || — || November 15, 2006 || Catalina || CSS || V || align=right | 1.1 km || 
|-id=191 bgcolor=#d6d6d6
| 331191 ||  || — || December 5, 2005 || Mount Lemmon || Mount Lemmon Survey || — || align=right | 3.1 km || 
|-id=192 bgcolor=#d6d6d6
| 331192 ||  || — || January 23, 2006 || Kitt Peak || Spacewatch || — || align=right | 2.4 km || 
|-id=193 bgcolor=#E9E9E9
| 331193 ||  || — || October 26, 2005 || Kitt Peak || Spacewatch || WIT || align=right | 1.0 km || 
|-id=194 bgcolor=#d6d6d6
| 331194 ||  || — || October 22, 2003 || Apache Point || SDSS || — || align=right | 3.6 km || 
|-id=195 bgcolor=#d6d6d6
| 331195 ||  || — || January 26, 2006 || Mount Lemmon || Mount Lemmon Survey || — || align=right | 2.9 km || 
|-id=196 bgcolor=#fefefe
| 331196 ||  || — || September 19, 2006 || Catalina || CSS || — || align=right data-sort-value="0.91" | 910 m || 
|-id=197 bgcolor=#E9E9E9
| 331197 ||  || — || February 8, 2007 || Kitt Peak || Spacewatch || EUN || align=right | 1.3 km || 
|-id=198 bgcolor=#E9E9E9
| 331198 ||  || — || January 13, 2002 || Socorro || LINEAR || — || align=right | 3.1 km || 
|-id=199 bgcolor=#E9E9E9
| 331199 ||  || — || March 10, 2007 || Mount Lemmon || Mount Lemmon Survey || — || align=right | 1.9 km || 
|-id=200 bgcolor=#E9E9E9
| 331200 ||  || — || April 10, 2003 || Kitt Peak || Spacewatch || — || align=right | 1.9 km || 
|}

331201–331300 

|-bgcolor=#d6d6d6
| 331201 ||  || — || December 12, 2004 || Kitt Peak || Spacewatch || — || align=right | 2.9 km || 
|-id=202 bgcolor=#E9E9E9
| 331202 ||  || — || November 4, 2005 || Kitt Peak || Spacewatch || — || align=right | 1.5 km || 
|-id=203 bgcolor=#E9E9E9
| 331203 ||  || — || October 26, 2009 || Mount Lemmon || Mount Lemmon Survey || — || align=right | 3.5 km || 
|-id=204 bgcolor=#d6d6d6
| 331204 ||  || — || April 25, 2007 || Kitt Peak || Spacewatch || — || align=right | 4.0 km || 
|-id=205 bgcolor=#E9E9E9
| 331205 ||  || — || August 8, 2004 || Socorro || LINEAR || — || align=right | 1.9 km || 
|-id=206 bgcolor=#E9E9E9
| 331206 ||  || — || September 17, 2009 || Mount Lemmon || Mount Lemmon Survey || AGN || align=right | 1.3 km || 
|-id=207 bgcolor=#E9E9E9
| 331207 ||  || — || February 17, 2007 || Kitt Peak || Spacewatch || — || align=right | 1.4 km || 
|-id=208 bgcolor=#E9E9E9
| 331208 ||  || — || March 14, 2007 || Mount Lemmon || Mount Lemmon Survey || WIT || align=right | 1.3 km || 
|-id=209 bgcolor=#d6d6d6
| 331209 ||  || — || October 22, 2009 || Mount Lemmon || Mount Lemmon Survey || HYG || align=right | 3.0 km || 
|-id=210 bgcolor=#d6d6d6
| 331210 ||  || — || February 2, 2006 || Mount Lemmon || Mount Lemmon Survey || EMA || align=right | 3.0 km || 
|-id=211 bgcolor=#d6d6d6
| 331211 ||  || — || April 23, 2006 || Anderson Mesa || LONEOS || — || align=right | 5.9 km || 
|-id=212 bgcolor=#d6d6d6
| 331212 ||  || — || March 5, 2000 || Socorro || LINEAR || — || align=right | 3.5 km || 
|-id=213 bgcolor=#d6d6d6
| 331213 ||  || — || March 11, 2005 || Mount Lemmon || Mount Lemmon Survey || — || align=right | 4.6 km || 
|-id=214 bgcolor=#d6d6d6
| 331214 ||  || — || March 3, 2000 || Kitt Peak || Spacewatch || — || align=right | 3.7 km || 
|-id=215 bgcolor=#d6d6d6
| 331215 ||  || — || October 12, 2009 || Mount Lemmon || Mount Lemmon Survey || EOS || align=right | 2.5 km || 
|-id=216 bgcolor=#d6d6d6
| 331216 ||  || — || March 24, 2006 || Kitt Peak || Spacewatch || — || align=right | 4.7 km || 
|-id=217 bgcolor=#E9E9E9
| 331217 ||  || — || October 28, 2005 || Kitt Peak || Spacewatch || — || align=right | 1.0 km || 
|-id=218 bgcolor=#d6d6d6
| 331218 ||  || — || November 4, 2004 || Kitt Peak || Spacewatch || — || align=right | 2.8 km || 
|-id=219 bgcolor=#fefefe
| 331219 ||  || — || March 12, 2008 || Kitt Peak || Spacewatch || FLO || align=right data-sort-value="0.64" | 640 m || 
|-id=220 bgcolor=#d6d6d6
| 331220 ||  || — || January 11, 2011 || Kitt Peak || Spacewatch || HYG || align=right | 3.8 km || 
|-id=221 bgcolor=#fefefe
| 331221 ||  || — || June 23, 2005 || Palomar || NEAT || — || align=right | 1.2 km || 
|-id=222 bgcolor=#E9E9E9
| 331222 ||  || — || January 19, 2002 || Kitt Peak || Spacewatch || — || align=right | 2.8 km || 
|-id=223 bgcolor=#d6d6d6
| 331223 ||  || — || September 22, 2009 || Mount Lemmon || Mount Lemmon Survey || — || align=right | 2.8 km || 
|-id=224 bgcolor=#d6d6d6
| 331224 ||  || — || April 22, 2007 || Mount Lemmon || Mount Lemmon Survey || KOR || align=right | 1.4 km || 
|-id=225 bgcolor=#E9E9E9
| 331225 ||  || — || January 7, 2006 || Kitt Peak || Spacewatch || AGN || align=right | 1.2 km || 
|-id=226 bgcolor=#E9E9E9
| 331226 ||  || — || September 26, 1995 || Kitt Peak || Spacewatch || — || align=right | 2.4 km || 
|-id=227 bgcolor=#fefefe
| 331227 ||  || — || November 17, 2006 || Mount Lemmon || Mount Lemmon Survey || V || align=right data-sort-value="0.92" | 920 m || 
|-id=228 bgcolor=#E9E9E9
| 331228 ||  || — || November 30, 2005 || Kitt Peak || Spacewatch || XIZ || align=right | 1.5 km || 
|-id=229 bgcolor=#E9E9E9
| 331229 ||  || — || November 4, 2005 || Mount Lemmon || Mount Lemmon Survey || — || align=right | 2.4 km || 
|-id=230 bgcolor=#E9E9E9
| 331230 ||  || — || January 24, 2007 || Catalina || CSS || — || align=right | 2.6 km || 
|-id=231 bgcolor=#E9E9E9
| 331231 ||  || — || December 4, 2005 || Kitt Peak || Spacewatch || MRX || align=right | 1.3 km || 
|-id=232 bgcolor=#E9E9E9
| 331232 ||  || — || February 26, 2007 || Mount Lemmon || Mount Lemmon Survey || — || align=right | 2.7 km || 
|-id=233 bgcolor=#d6d6d6
| 331233 ||  || — || November 17, 2009 || Catalina || CSS || — || align=right | 3.8 km || 
|-id=234 bgcolor=#d6d6d6
| 331234 ||  || — || October 1, 2009 || Mount Lemmon || Mount Lemmon Survey || — || align=right | 3.8 km || 
|-id=235 bgcolor=#d6d6d6
| 331235 ||  || — || October 27, 2005 || Mount Lemmon || Mount Lemmon Survey || KOR || align=right | 1.6 km || 
|-id=236 bgcolor=#E9E9E9
| 331236 ||  || — || December 5, 2010 || Mount Lemmon || Mount Lemmon Survey || ADE || align=right | 2.2 km || 
|-id=237 bgcolor=#E9E9E9
| 331237 ||  || — || November 25, 2005 || Kitt Peak || Spacewatch || — || align=right | 2.3 km || 
|-id=238 bgcolor=#E9E9E9
| 331238 ||  || — || November 25, 2005 || Kitt Peak || Spacewatch || — || align=right | 3.8 km || 
|-id=239 bgcolor=#E9E9E9
| 331239 ||  || — || October 26, 2009 || Kitt Peak || Spacewatch || — || align=right | 3.4 km || 
|-id=240 bgcolor=#E9E9E9
| 331240 ||  || — || January 27, 2007 || Kitt Peak || Spacewatch || — || align=right | 1.1 km || 
|-id=241 bgcolor=#E9E9E9
| 331241 ||  || — || March 16, 2007 || Mount Lemmon || Mount Lemmon Survey || WIT || align=right | 1.2 km || 
|-id=242 bgcolor=#fefefe
| 331242 ||  || — || June 17, 2005 || Mount Lemmon || Mount Lemmon Survey || — || align=right | 1.1 km || 
|-id=243 bgcolor=#fefefe
| 331243 ||  || — || October 31, 2002 || Socorro || LINEAR || V || align=right data-sort-value="0.81" | 810 m || 
|-id=244 bgcolor=#E9E9E9
| 331244 ||  || — || November 4, 2005 || Mount Lemmon || Mount Lemmon Survey || — || align=right | 1.7 km || 
|-id=245 bgcolor=#E9E9E9
| 331245 ||  || — || October 27, 2005 || Anderson Mesa || LONEOS || — || align=right | 1.8 km || 
|-id=246 bgcolor=#E9E9E9
| 331246 ||  || — || March 12, 2002 || Kitt Peak || Spacewatch || — || align=right | 2.6 km || 
|-id=247 bgcolor=#E9E9E9
| 331247 ||  || — || October 11, 2009 || Mount Lemmon || Mount Lemmon Survey || — || align=right | 2.1 km || 
|-id=248 bgcolor=#E9E9E9
| 331248 ||  || — || April 11, 2008 || Mount Lemmon || Mount Lemmon Survey || — || align=right | 1.4 km || 
|-id=249 bgcolor=#d6d6d6
| 331249 ||  || — || January 6, 2010 || Mount Lemmon || Mount Lemmon Survey || — || align=right | 4.9 km || 
|-id=250 bgcolor=#d6d6d6
| 331250 ||  || — || September 19, 2003 || Kitt Peak || Spacewatch || — || align=right | 3.5 km || 
|-id=251 bgcolor=#d6d6d6
| 331251 ||  || — || January 27, 2006 || Catalina || CSS || — || align=right | 5.4 km || 
|-id=252 bgcolor=#E9E9E9
| 331252 ||  || — || January 9, 2002 || Socorro || LINEAR || — || align=right | 2.2 km || 
|-id=253 bgcolor=#d6d6d6
| 331253 ||  || — || October 18, 2009 || Catalina || CSS || — || align=right | 4.4 km || 
|-id=254 bgcolor=#d6d6d6
| 331254 ||  || — || October 25, 2009 || Mount Lemmon || Mount Lemmon Survey || — || align=right | 3.3 km || 
|-id=255 bgcolor=#E9E9E9
| 331255 ||  || — || September 29, 2009 || Mount Lemmon || Mount Lemmon Survey || — || align=right | 1.5 km || 
|-id=256 bgcolor=#E9E9E9
| 331256 ||  || — || December 5, 2005 || Kitt Peak || Spacewatch || HOF || align=right | 3.8 km || 
|-id=257 bgcolor=#E9E9E9
| 331257 ||  || — || October 25, 2005 || Kitt Peak || Spacewatch || — || align=right | 1.3 km || 
|-id=258 bgcolor=#E9E9E9
| 331258 ||  || — || August 20, 2009 || Catalina || CSS || — || align=right | 3.4 km || 
|-id=259 bgcolor=#d6d6d6
| 331259 ||  || — || January 27, 2000 || Kitt Peak || Spacewatch || — || align=right | 3.0 km || 
|-id=260 bgcolor=#E9E9E9
| 331260 ||  || — || March 20, 2007 || Kitt Peak || Spacewatch || — || align=right | 2.7 km || 
|-id=261 bgcolor=#d6d6d6
| 331261 ||  || — || October 24, 2009 || Mount Lemmon || Mount Lemmon Survey || EOS || align=right | 2.2 km || 
|-id=262 bgcolor=#d6d6d6
| 331262 ||  || — || August 5, 2002 || Palomar || NEAT || — || align=right | 4.1 km || 
|-id=263 bgcolor=#E9E9E9
| 331263 ||  || — || November 30, 2005 || Kitt Peak || Spacewatch || NEM || align=right | 2.2 km || 
|-id=264 bgcolor=#d6d6d6
| 331264 ||  || — || February 24, 2006 || Kitt Peak || Spacewatch || — || align=right | 2.5 km || 
|-id=265 bgcolor=#E9E9E9
| 331265 ||  || — || September 7, 2004 || Kitt Peak || Spacewatch || — || align=right | 1.8 km || 
|-id=266 bgcolor=#E9E9E9
| 331266 ||  || — || March 10, 2003 || Kitt Peak || Spacewatch || — || align=right | 1.1 km || 
|-id=267 bgcolor=#d6d6d6
| 331267 ||  || — || March 23, 2001 || Haleakala || NEAT || — || align=right | 4.5 km || 
|-id=268 bgcolor=#d6d6d6
| 331268 ||  || — || January 16, 2000 || Kitt Peak || Spacewatch || — || align=right | 3.4 km || 
|-id=269 bgcolor=#d6d6d6
| 331269 ||  || — || March 9, 2006 || Kitt Peak || Spacewatch || — || align=right | 3.2 km || 
|-id=270 bgcolor=#E9E9E9
| 331270 ||  || — || December 4, 2005 || Kitt Peak || Spacewatch || — || align=right | 2.2 km || 
|-id=271 bgcolor=#d6d6d6
| 331271 ||  || — || September 28, 2009 || Mount Lemmon || Mount Lemmon Survey || — || align=right | 3.2 km || 
|-id=272 bgcolor=#d6d6d6
| 331272 ||  || — || September 21, 2003 || Kitt Peak || Spacewatch || HYG || align=right | 2.8 km || 
|-id=273 bgcolor=#E9E9E9
| 331273 ||  || — || March 16, 2007 || Mount Lemmon || Mount Lemmon Survey || — || align=right | 1.5 km || 
|-id=274 bgcolor=#d6d6d6
| 331274 ||  || — || August 26, 2003 || Cerro Tololo || M. W. Buie || — || align=right | 2.8 km || 
|-id=275 bgcolor=#d6d6d6
| 331275 ||  || — || September 4, 2008 || Kitt Peak || Spacewatch || 3:2 || align=right | 3.7 km || 
|-id=276 bgcolor=#d6d6d6
| 331276 ||  || — || January 15, 2005 || Kitt Peak || Spacewatch || HYG || align=right | 3.4 km || 
|-id=277 bgcolor=#d6d6d6
| 331277 ||  || — || February 24, 2006 || Kitt Peak || Spacewatch || LIX || align=right | 3.9 km || 
|-id=278 bgcolor=#E9E9E9
| 331278 ||  || — || September 6, 2008 || Catalina || CSS || DOR || align=right | 2.6 km || 
|-id=279 bgcolor=#d6d6d6
| 331279 ||  || — || June 7, 2002 || Palomar || NEAT || — || align=right | 3.5 km || 
|-id=280 bgcolor=#d6d6d6
| 331280 ||  || — || February 22, 2003 || Kitt Peak || Spacewatch || 3:2 || align=right | 5.3 km || 
|-id=281 bgcolor=#d6d6d6
| 331281 ||  || — || March 11, 2000 || Anderson Mesa || LONEOS || TIR || align=right | 3.5 km || 
|-id=282 bgcolor=#E9E9E9
| 331282 ||  || — || August 6, 2004 || Palomar || NEAT || — || align=right | 2.2 km || 
|-id=283 bgcolor=#d6d6d6
| 331283 ||  || — || February 2, 2000 || Kitt Peak || Spacewatch || — || align=right | 4.5 km || 
|-id=284 bgcolor=#d6d6d6
| 331284 ||  || — || February 1, 1995 || Kitt Peak || Spacewatch || — || align=right | 3.5 km || 
|-id=285 bgcolor=#d6d6d6
| 331285 ||  || — || January 8, 2006 || Mount Lemmon || Mount Lemmon Survey || — || align=right | 2.7 km || 
|-id=286 bgcolor=#d6d6d6
| 331286 ||  || — || January 30, 2006 || Kitt Peak || Spacewatch || — || align=right | 2.1 km || 
|-id=287 bgcolor=#d6d6d6
| 331287 ||  || — || December 3, 2005 || Mauna Kea || A. Boattini || — || align=right | 2.8 km || 
|-id=288 bgcolor=#d6d6d6
| 331288 ||  || — || September 13, 2002 || Palomar || NEAT || — || align=right | 3.7 km || 
|-id=289 bgcolor=#d6d6d6
| 331289 ||  || — || September 26, 2003 || Socorro || LINEAR || HYG || align=right | 2.6 km || 
|-id=290 bgcolor=#E9E9E9
| 331290 ||  || — || October 21, 1995 || Kitt Peak || Spacewatch || — || align=right | 3.0 km || 
|-id=291 bgcolor=#E9E9E9
| 331291 ||  || — || September 21, 2004 || Kitt Peak || Spacewatch || PAD || align=right | 1.9 km || 
|-id=292 bgcolor=#E9E9E9
| 331292 ||  || — || December 1, 2005 || Kitt Peak || Spacewatch || — || align=right | 1.8 km || 
|-id=293 bgcolor=#fefefe
| 331293 ||  || — || June 2, 1998 || Kitt Peak || Spacewatch || — || align=right data-sort-value="0.91" | 910 m || 
|-id=294 bgcolor=#d6d6d6
| 331294 ||  || — || February 11, 2010 || WISE || WISE || — || align=right | 3.7 km || 
|-id=295 bgcolor=#E9E9E9
| 331295 ||  || — || August 18, 2009 || Kitt Peak || Spacewatch || XIZ || align=right | 1.5 km || 
|-id=296 bgcolor=#fefefe
| 331296 ||  || — || October 23, 2006 || Kitt Peak || Spacewatch || — || align=right data-sort-value="0.74" | 740 m || 
|-id=297 bgcolor=#d6d6d6
| 331297 ||  || — || December 26, 2009 || Kitt Peak || Spacewatch || — || align=right | 4.0 km || 
|-id=298 bgcolor=#d6d6d6
| 331298 ||  || — || July 30, 2008 || Mount Lemmon || Mount Lemmon Survey || — || align=right | 3.7 km || 
|-id=299 bgcolor=#d6d6d6
| 331299 ||  || — || May 11, 2007 || Mount Lemmon || Mount Lemmon Survey || — || align=right | 3.4 km || 
|-id=300 bgcolor=#E9E9E9
| 331300 ||  || — || December 23, 2001 || Kitt Peak || Spacewatch || — || align=right | 1.8 km || 
|}

331301–331400 

|-bgcolor=#E9E9E9
| 331301 ||  || — || January 31, 2006 || Kitt Peak || Spacewatch || AGN || align=right | 1.6 km || 
|-id=302 bgcolor=#fefefe
| 331302 ||  || — || April 13, 2004 || Kitt Peak || Spacewatch || — || align=right data-sort-value="0.85" | 850 m || 
|-id=303 bgcolor=#d6d6d6
| 331303 ||  || — || October 8, 2002 || Haleakala || NEAT || EUP || align=right | 5.0 km || 
|-id=304 bgcolor=#d6d6d6
| 331304 ||  || — || April 21, 1996 || Kitt Peak || Spacewatch || — || align=right | 3.7 km || 
|-id=305 bgcolor=#d6d6d6
| 331305 ||  || — || October 29, 2003 || Kitt Peak || Spacewatch || — || align=right | 4.2 km || 
|-id=306 bgcolor=#d6d6d6
| 331306 ||  || — || January 17, 2005 || Kitt Peak || Spacewatch || EOS || align=right | 2.5 km || 
|-id=307 bgcolor=#d6d6d6
| 331307 ||  || — || May 22, 2006 || Kitt Peak || Spacewatch || — || align=right | 3.7 km || 
|-id=308 bgcolor=#d6d6d6
| 331308 ||  || — || November 25, 2009 || Mount Lemmon || Mount Lemmon Survey || HYG || align=right | 2.8 km || 
|-id=309 bgcolor=#d6d6d6
| 331309 ||  || — || November 23, 2009 || Catalina || CSS || — || align=right | 3.9 km || 
|-id=310 bgcolor=#fefefe
| 331310 ||  || — || August 28, 2005 || Kitt Peak || Spacewatch || V || align=right data-sort-value="0.72" | 720 m || 
|-id=311 bgcolor=#d6d6d6
| 331311 ||  || — || April 7, 2000 || Socorro || LINEAR || TIR || align=right | 4.3 km || 
|-id=312 bgcolor=#fefefe
| 331312 ||  || — || July 27, 2005 || Palomar || NEAT || — || align=right data-sort-value="0.95" | 950 m || 
|-id=313 bgcolor=#d6d6d6
| 331313 ||  || — || October 20, 2003 || Palomar || NEAT || EOS || align=right | 2.3 km || 
|-id=314 bgcolor=#d6d6d6
| 331314 ||  || — || September 20, 2007 || Kitt Peak || Spacewatch || EUP || align=right | 4.0 km || 
|-id=315 bgcolor=#d6d6d6
| 331315 ||  || — || January 13, 2005 || Catalina || CSS || — || align=right | 4.9 km || 
|-id=316 bgcolor=#d6d6d6
| 331316 Cavedon ||  ||  || April 20, 2006 || Vallemare di Borbona || V. S. Casulli || — || align=right | 4.3 km || 
|-id=317 bgcolor=#d6d6d6
| 331317 ||  || — || January 28, 1995 || Kitt Peak || Spacewatch || — || align=right | 4.4 km || 
|-id=318 bgcolor=#E9E9E9
| 331318 ||  || — || September 13, 2002 || Palomar || NEAT || — || align=right | 3.0 km || 
|-id=319 bgcolor=#fefefe
| 331319 ||  || — || May 7, 2006 || Mount Lemmon || Mount Lemmon Survey || — || align=right data-sort-value="0.93" | 930 m || 
|-id=320 bgcolor=#fefefe
| 331320 ||  || — || September 9, 2007 || Kitt Peak || Spacewatch || V || align=right | 1.00 km || 
|-id=321 bgcolor=#d6d6d6
| 331321 ||  || — || September 24, 2006 || Kitt Peak || Spacewatch || KOR || align=right | 1.4 km || 
|-id=322 bgcolor=#d6d6d6
| 331322 ||  || — || November 30, 2006 || Kitt Peak || Spacewatch || — || align=right | 2.9 km || 
|-id=323 bgcolor=#d6d6d6
| 331323 ||  || — || April 22, 2004 || Kitt Peak || Spacewatch || — || align=right | 3.4 km || 
|-id=324 bgcolor=#E9E9E9
| 331324 ||  || — || February 28, 2000 || Socorro || LINEAR || — || align=right | 1.2 km || 
|-id=325 bgcolor=#d6d6d6
| 331325 ||  || — || February 25, 2007 || Mount Lemmon || Mount Lemmon Survey || JLI || align=right | 4.2 km || 
|-id=326 bgcolor=#E9E9E9
| 331326 ||  || — || February 10, 2003 || Kitt Peak || Spacewatch || — || align=right | 2.0 km || 
|-id=327 bgcolor=#fefefe
| 331327 ||  || — || January 31, 1998 || Kitt Peak || Spacewatch || FLO || align=right data-sort-value="0.60" | 600 m || 
|-id=328 bgcolor=#E9E9E9
| 331328 ||  || — || January 15, 2004 || Kitt Peak || Spacewatch || — || align=right data-sort-value="0.81" | 810 m || 
|-id=329 bgcolor=#d6d6d6
| 331329 ||  || — || April 11, 2002 || Palomar || NEAT || — || align=right | 3.9 km || 
|-id=330 bgcolor=#d6d6d6
| 331330 ||  || — || June 29, 1997 || Kitt Peak || Spacewatch || — || align=right | 5.4 km || 
|-id=331 bgcolor=#fefefe
| 331331 ||  || — || October 5, 2002 || Palomar || NEAT || — || align=right | 1.4 km || 
|-id=332 bgcolor=#d6d6d6
| 331332 ||  || — || October 29, 2005 || Catalina || CSS || — || align=right | 3.5 km || 
|-id=333 bgcolor=#d6d6d6
| 331333 ||  || — || January 21, 2001 || Socorro || LINEAR || — || align=right | 4.4 km || 
|-id=334 bgcolor=#fefefe
| 331334 ||  || — || March 18, 2001 || Haleakala || NEAT || NYS || align=right data-sort-value="0.88" | 880 m || 
|-id=335 bgcolor=#E9E9E9
| 331335 ||  || — || September 15, 1998 || Anderson Mesa || LONEOS || — || align=right | 1.6 km || 
|-id=336 bgcolor=#E9E9E9
| 331336 ||  || — || June 29, 2005 || Kitt Peak || Spacewatch || — || align=right | 1.9 km || 
|-id=337 bgcolor=#fefefe
| 331337 ||  || — || September 17, 2003 || Kitt Peak || Spacewatch || — || align=right data-sort-value="0.89" | 890 m || 
|-id=338 bgcolor=#E9E9E9
| 331338 ||  || — || August 28, 2006 || Kitt Peak || Spacewatch || — || align=right data-sort-value="0.99" | 990 m || 
|-id=339 bgcolor=#fefefe
| 331339 ||  || — || October 6, 1996 || Kitt Peak || Spacewatch || V || align=right data-sort-value="0.75" | 750 m || 
|-id=340 bgcolor=#fefefe
| 331340 ||  || — || November 5, 1999 || Kitt Peak || Spacewatch || MAS || align=right data-sort-value="0.89" | 890 m || 
|-id=341 bgcolor=#d6d6d6
| 331341 Frankscholten ||  ||  || February 19, 2002 || Cima Ekar || ADAS || — || align=right | 3.1 km || 
|-id=342 bgcolor=#E9E9E9
| 331342 ||  || — || September 28, 2006 || Catalina || CSS || — || align=right | 2.2 km || 
|-id=343 bgcolor=#E9E9E9
| 331343 ||  || — || September 26, 2005 || Kitt Peak || Spacewatch || — || align=right | 1.9 km || 
|-id=344 bgcolor=#E9E9E9
| 331344 ||  || — || September 30, 2005 || Kitt Peak || Spacewatch || — || align=right | 2.0 km || 
|-id=345 bgcolor=#d6d6d6
| 331345 ||  || — || January 19, 2002 || Kitt Peak || Spacewatch || — || align=right | 3.0 km || 
|-id=346 bgcolor=#fefefe
| 331346 ||  || — || March 4, 2005 || Kitt Peak || Spacewatch || — || align=right data-sort-value="0.72" | 720 m || 
|-id=347 bgcolor=#d6d6d6
| 331347 ||  || — || September 7, 2004 || Socorro || LINEAR || — || align=right | 3.9 km || 
|-id=348 bgcolor=#fefefe
| 331348 ||  || — || March 11, 2005 || Kitt Peak || Spacewatch || MAS || align=right data-sort-value="0.72" | 720 m || 
|-id=349 bgcolor=#E9E9E9
| 331349 ||  || — || November 20, 2001 || Socorro || LINEAR || AST || align=right | 2.1 km || 
|-id=350 bgcolor=#fefefe
| 331350 ||  || — || March 3, 2005 || Catalina || CSS || — || align=right data-sort-value="0.98" | 980 m || 
|-id=351 bgcolor=#fefefe
| 331351 ||  || — || April 4, 2005 || Mount Lemmon || Mount Lemmon Survey || V || align=right data-sort-value="0.73" | 730 m || 
|-id=352 bgcolor=#d6d6d6
| 331352 ||  || — || March 16, 2007 || Kitt Peak || Spacewatch || — || align=right | 3.2 km || 
|-id=353 bgcolor=#fefefe
| 331353 ||  || — || October 10, 1999 || Kitt Peak || Spacewatch || MAS || align=right data-sort-value="0.73" | 730 m || 
|-id=354 bgcolor=#d6d6d6
| 331354 ||  || — || December 2, 2004 || Catalina || CSS || — || align=right | 4.5 km || 
|-id=355 bgcolor=#d6d6d6
| 331355 ||  || — || October 9, 2004 || Kitt Peak || Spacewatch || — || align=right | 3.1 km || 
|-id=356 bgcolor=#E9E9E9
| 331356 ||  || — || November 7, 2010 || Catalina || CSS || — || align=right | 3.1 km || 
|-id=357 bgcolor=#fefefe
| 331357 ||  || — || January 16, 2005 || Kitt Peak || Spacewatch || — || align=right data-sort-value="0.94" | 940 m || 
|-id=358 bgcolor=#fefefe
| 331358 ||  || — || December 23, 2003 || Socorro || LINEAR || NYS || align=right data-sort-value="0.80" | 800 m || 
|-id=359 bgcolor=#d6d6d6
| 331359 ||  || — || January 27, 2006 || Catalina || CSS || — || align=right | 4.8 km || 
|-id=360 bgcolor=#E9E9E9
| 331360 ||  || — || January 16, 1996 || Kitt Peak || Spacewatch || — || align=right data-sort-value="0.86" | 860 m || 
|-id=361 bgcolor=#fefefe
| 331361 ||  || — || March 11, 2005 || Anderson Mesa || LONEOS || PHO || align=right | 3.4 km || 
|-id=362 bgcolor=#fefefe
| 331362 ||  || — || October 17, 2003 || Kitt Peak || Spacewatch || FLO || align=right data-sort-value="0.64" | 640 m || 
|-id=363 bgcolor=#d6d6d6
| 331363 ||  || — || December 25, 2005 || Mount Lemmon || Mount Lemmon Survey || THM || align=right | 2.1 km || 
|-id=364 bgcolor=#d6d6d6
| 331364 ||  || — || August 20, 2003 || Palomar || NEAT || ALA || align=right | 3.4 km || 
|-id=365 bgcolor=#fefefe
| 331365 ||  || — || September 19, 2006 || Catalina || CSS || — || align=right | 1.2 km || 
|-id=366 bgcolor=#fefefe
| 331366 ||  || — || November 20, 2006 || Kitt Peak || Spacewatch || NYS || align=right data-sort-value="0.76" | 760 m || 
|-id=367 bgcolor=#d6d6d6
| 331367 ||  || — || January 19, 2001 || Kitt Peak || Spacewatch || — || align=right | 3.9 km || 
|-id=368 bgcolor=#d6d6d6
| 331368 ||  || — || October 19, 2003 || Kitt Peak || Spacewatch || — || align=right | 3.8 km || 
|-id=369 bgcolor=#d6d6d6
| 331369 ||  || — || March 14, 2007 || Mount Lemmon || Mount Lemmon Survey || — || align=right | 2.9 km || 
|-id=370 bgcolor=#E9E9E9
| 331370 ||  || — || September 1, 2005 || Kitt Peak || Spacewatch || — || align=right | 1.9 km || 
|-id=371 bgcolor=#d6d6d6
| 331371 ||  || — || February 16, 2001 || Cima Ekar || ADAS || EOS || align=right | 2.3 km || 
|-id=372 bgcolor=#d6d6d6
| 331372 ||  || — || September 26, 2003 || Apache Point || SDSS || HYG || align=right | 2.5 km || 
|-id=373 bgcolor=#d6d6d6
| 331373 ||  || — || January 31, 2006 || Kitt Peak || Spacewatch || THM || align=right | 2.9 km || 
|-id=374 bgcolor=#fefefe
| 331374 ||  || — || July 17, 2002 || Palomar || NEAT || V || align=right data-sort-value="0.82" | 820 m || 
|-id=375 bgcolor=#E9E9E9
| 331375 ||  || — || March 10, 2003 || Kitt Peak || Spacewatch || — || align=right | 2.3 km || 
|-id=376 bgcolor=#d6d6d6
| 331376 ||  || — || December 2, 2005 || Catalina || CSS || — || align=right | 3.6 km || 
|-id=377 bgcolor=#fefefe
| 331377 ||  || — || April 4, 2005 || Mount Lemmon || Mount Lemmon Survey || — || align=right data-sort-value="0.75" | 750 m || 
|-id=378 bgcolor=#fefefe
| 331378 ||  || — || April 4, 2002 || Palomar || NEAT || — || align=right data-sort-value="0.91" | 910 m || 
|-id=379 bgcolor=#E9E9E9
| 331379 ||  || — || August 3, 2000 || Kitt Peak || Spacewatch || — || align=right | 1.7 km || 
|-id=380 bgcolor=#fefefe
| 331380 ||  || — || March 13, 2005 || Mount Lemmon || Mount Lemmon Survey || — || align=right data-sort-value="0.68" | 680 m || 
|-id=381 bgcolor=#fefefe
| 331381 ||  || — || September 26, 2006 || Kitt Peak || Spacewatch || NYS || align=right data-sort-value="0.75" | 750 m || 
|-id=382 bgcolor=#fefefe
| 331382 ||  || — || November 1, 2006 || Mount Lemmon || Mount Lemmon Survey || — || align=right | 1.1 km || 
|-id=383 bgcolor=#E9E9E9
| 331383 ||  || — || August 28, 2005 || Kitt Peak || Spacewatch || — || align=right | 2.0 km || 
|-id=384 bgcolor=#E9E9E9
| 331384 ||  || — || March 7, 2003 || Anderson Mesa || LONEOS || — || align=right | 2.6 km || 
|-id=385 bgcolor=#fefefe
| 331385 ||  || — || October 17, 1995 || Kitt Peak || Spacewatch || — || align=right data-sort-value="0.82" | 820 m || 
|-id=386 bgcolor=#fefefe
| 331386 ||  || — || March 17, 2005 || Kitt Peak || Spacewatch || — || align=right data-sort-value="0.97" | 970 m || 
|-id=387 bgcolor=#E9E9E9
| 331387 ||  || — || March 6, 2003 || Anderson Mesa || LONEOS || — || align=right | 3.0 km || 
|-id=388 bgcolor=#E9E9E9
| 331388 ||  || — || September 14, 2005 || Kitt Peak || Spacewatch || — || align=right | 1.9 km || 
|-id=389 bgcolor=#E9E9E9
| 331389 ||  || — || September 26, 2005 || Kitt Peak || Spacewatch || — || align=right | 1.8 km || 
|-id=390 bgcolor=#fefefe
| 331390 ||  || — || September 28, 2006 || Mount Lemmon || Mount Lemmon Survey || — || align=right data-sort-value="0.84" | 840 m || 
|-id=391 bgcolor=#fefefe
| 331391 ||  || — || October 23, 2003 || Apache Point || SDSS || — || align=right data-sort-value="0.98" | 980 m || 
|-id=392 bgcolor=#d6d6d6
| 331392 ||  || — || October 11, 2004 || Kitt Peak || Spacewatch || — || align=right | 2.7 km || 
|-id=393 bgcolor=#fefefe
| 331393 ||  || — || March 19, 2009 || Mount Lemmon || Mount Lemmon Survey || — || align=right data-sort-value="0.74" | 740 m || 
|-id=394 bgcolor=#E9E9E9
| 331394 ||  || — || January 4, 2003 || Kitt Peak || Spacewatch || — || align=right | 1.5 km || 
|-id=395 bgcolor=#fefefe
| 331395 ||  || — || November 13, 2007 || Kitt Peak || Spacewatch || — || align=right data-sort-value="0.67" | 670 m || 
|-id=396 bgcolor=#E9E9E9
| 331396 ||  || — || September 27, 2000 || Kitt Peak || Spacewatch || — || align=right | 2.8 km || 
|-id=397 bgcolor=#d6d6d6
| 331397 ||  || — || January 7, 2006 || Anderson Mesa || LONEOS || — || align=right | 4.3 km || 
|-id=398 bgcolor=#E9E9E9
| 331398 ||  || — || March 10, 2003 || Palomar || NEAT || — || align=right | 3.1 km || 
|-id=399 bgcolor=#d6d6d6
| 331399 ||  || — || November 4, 2004 || Catalina || CSS || — || align=right | 3.5 km || 
|-id=400 bgcolor=#d6d6d6
| 331400 ||  || — || December 30, 2005 || Kitt Peak || Spacewatch || CHA || align=right | 2.5 km || 
|}

331401–331500 

|-bgcolor=#fefefe
| 331401 ||  || — || November 19, 2003 || Catalina || CSS || — || align=right | 1.2 km || 
|-id=402 bgcolor=#fefefe
| 331402 ||  || — || April 10, 2005 || Siding Spring || SSS || — || align=right | 1.0 km || 
|-id=403 bgcolor=#E9E9E9
| 331403 ||  || — || March 2, 1995 || Kitt Peak || Spacewatch || — || align=right | 1.1 km || 
|-id=404 bgcolor=#E9E9E9
| 331404 ||  || — || January 14, 2007 || Nyukasa || Mount Nyukasa Stn. || ADE || align=right | 2.7 km || 
|-id=405 bgcolor=#E9E9E9
| 331405 ||  || — || September 29, 2005 || Mount Lemmon || Mount Lemmon Survey || HEN || align=right | 1.2 km || 
|-id=406 bgcolor=#E9E9E9
| 331406 ||  || — || November 3, 1996 || Kitt Peak || Spacewatch || — || align=right | 3.9 km || 
|-id=407 bgcolor=#E9E9E9
| 331407 ||  || — || November 17, 2006 || Kitt Peak || Spacewatch || — || align=right | 1.7 km || 
|-id=408 bgcolor=#fefefe
| 331408 ||  || — || September 7, 1999 || Socorro || LINEAR || H || align=right | 1.0 km || 
|-id=409 bgcolor=#E9E9E9
| 331409 ||  || — || June 30, 2004 || Siding Spring || SSS || JUN || align=right | 1.4 km || 
|-id=410 bgcolor=#d6d6d6
| 331410 ||  || — || January 30, 2006 || Kitt Peak || Spacewatch || VER || align=right | 3.9 km || 
|-id=411 bgcolor=#fefefe
| 331411 ||  || — || March 3, 2005 || Kitt Peak || Spacewatch || FLO || align=right data-sort-value="0.67" | 670 m || 
|-id=412 bgcolor=#fefefe
| 331412 ||  || — || February 18, 2008 || Mount Lemmon || Mount Lemmon Survey || — || align=right | 1.3 km || 
|-id=413 bgcolor=#fefefe
| 331413 ||  || — || January 31, 1998 || Caussols || ODAS || NYS || align=right data-sort-value="0.71" | 710 m || 
|-id=414 bgcolor=#d6d6d6
| 331414 ||  || — || March 4, 2001 || Kitt Peak || Spacewatch || — || align=right | 3.3 km || 
|-id=415 bgcolor=#d6d6d6
| 331415 ||  || — || October 8, 2004 || Kitt Peak || Spacewatch || — || align=right | 4.4 km || 
|-id=416 bgcolor=#fefefe
| 331416 ||  || — || January 11, 2008 || Kitt Peak || Spacewatch || NYS || align=right data-sort-value="0.61" | 610 m || 
|-id=417 bgcolor=#d6d6d6
| 331417 ||  || — || January 14, 2002 || Kitt Peak || Spacewatch || — || align=right | 2.9 km || 
|-id=418 bgcolor=#d6d6d6
| 331418 ||  || — || August 11, 2002 || Palomar || NEAT || HYG || align=right | 3.8 km || 
|-id=419 bgcolor=#d6d6d6
| 331419 ||  || — || December 18, 1995 || Kitt Peak || Spacewatch || — || align=right | 2.7 km || 
|-id=420 bgcolor=#E9E9E9
| 331420 ||  || — || April 14, 2008 || Catalina || CSS || — || align=right | 1.3 km || 
|-id=421 bgcolor=#E9E9E9
| 331421 ||  || — || April 25, 2003 || Anderson Mesa || LONEOS || — || align=right | 2.9 km || 
|-id=422 bgcolor=#E9E9E9
| 331422 ||  || — || March 19, 1999 || Kitt Peak || Spacewatch || — || align=right | 1.6 km || 
|-id=423 bgcolor=#fefefe
| 331423 ||  || — || November 2, 2007 || Kitt Peak || Spacewatch || — || align=right data-sort-value="0.71" | 710 m || 
|-id=424 bgcolor=#E9E9E9
| 331424 ||  || — || October 2, 2005 || Mount Lemmon || Mount Lemmon Survey || — || align=right | 2.8 km || 
|-id=425 bgcolor=#d6d6d6
| 331425 ||  || — || December 8, 2004 || Socorro || LINEAR || — || align=right | 6.5 km || 
|-id=426 bgcolor=#E9E9E9
| 331426 ||  || — || April 28, 2003 || Anderson Mesa || LONEOS || — || align=right | 2.7 km || 
|-id=427 bgcolor=#fefefe
| 331427 ||  || — || March 6, 2008 || Mount Lemmon || Mount Lemmon Survey || — || align=right data-sort-value="0.95" | 950 m || 
|-id=428 bgcolor=#E9E9E9
| 331428 ||  || — || March 10, 1999 || Kitt Peak || Spacewatch || — || align=right | 1.7 km || 
|-id=429 bgcolor=#E9E9E9
| 331429 ||  || — || March 20, 1999 || Socorro || LINEAR || JUN || align=right | 1.3 km || 
|-id=430 bgcolor=#fefefe
| 331430 ||  || — || September 20, 1995 || Kitt Peak || Spacewatch || — || align=right data-sort-value="0.76" | 760 m || 
|-id=431 bgcolor=#E9E9E9
| 331431 ||  || — || April 9, 2003 || Kitt Peak || Spacewatch || — || align=right | 3.9 km || 
|-id=432 bgcolor=#d6d6d6
| 331432 ||  || — || October 25, 2003 || Anderson Mesa || LONEOS || — || align=right | 4.1 km || 
|-id=433 bgcolor=#E9E9E9
| 331433 ||  || — || February 23, 2007 || Kitt Peak || Spacewatch || — || align=right | 3.1 km || 
|-id=434 bgcolor=#E9E9E9
| 331434 ||  || — || January 26, 2007 || Kitt Peak || Spacewatch || — || align=right | 1.8 km || 
|-id=435 bgcolor=#fefefe
| 331435 ||  || — || June 1, 2005 || Kitt Peak || Spacewatch || — || align=right | 1.2 km || 
|-id=436 bgcolor=#d6d6d6
| 331436 ||  || — || August 11, 2002 || Palomar || NEAT || — || align=right | 4.7 km || 
|-id=437 bgcolor=#E9E9E9
| 331437 ||  || — || April 13, 2008 || Mount Lemmon || Mount Lemmon Survey || — || align=right | 1.4 km || 
|-id=438 bgcolor=#fefefe
| 331438 ||  || — || October 18, 2003 || Kitt Peak || Spacewatch || — || align=right data-sort-value="0.79" | 790 m || 
|-id=439 bgcolor=#d6d6d6
| 331439 ||  || — || February 1, 2000 || Kitt Peak || Spacewatch || EOS || align=right | 2.2 km || 
|-id=440 bgcolor=#d6d6d6
| 331440 ||  || — || January 7, 2006 || Mount Lemmon || Mount Lemmon Survey || — || align=right | 3.5 km || 
|-id=441 bgcolor=#d6d6d6
| 331441 ||  || — || August 21, 2008 || Kitt Peak || Spacewatch || — || align=right | 3.4 km || 
|-id=442 bgcolor=#d6d6d6
| 331442 ||  || — || June 23, 1995 || Kitt Peak || Spacewatch || — || align=right | 3.7 km || 
|-id=443 bgcolor=#d6d6d6
| 331443 ||  || — || June 9, 2007 || Catalina || CSS || — || align=right | 4.5 km || 
|-id=444 bgcolor=#d6d6d6
| 331444 ||  || — || February 25, 2006 || Kitt Peak || Spacewatch || — || align=right | 3.0 km || 
|-id=445 bgcolor=#d6d6d6
| 331445 ||  || — || May 11, 2007 || Mount Lemmon || Mount Lemmon Survey || — || align=right | 5.3 km || 
|-id=446 bgcolor=#E9E9E9
| 331446 ||  || — || September 10, 2004 || Kitt Peak || Spacewatch || — || align=right | 2.8 km || 
|-id=447 bgcolor=#fefefe
| 331447 ||  || — || September 30, 1991 || Kitt Peak || Spacewatch || — || align=right | 1.1 km || 
|-id=448 bgcolor=#d6d6d6
| 331448 ||  || — || October 29, 2003 || Kitt Peak || Spacewatch || EUP || align=right | 5.8 km || 
|-id=449 bgcolor=#d6d6d6
| 331449 ||  || — || January 23, 2006 || Kitt Peak || Spacewatch || — || align=right | 3.7 km || 
|-id=450 bgcolor=#d6d6d6
| 331450 ||  || — || March 1, 1992 || La Silla || UESAC || — || align=right | 3.8 km || 
|-id=451 bgcolor=#d6d6d6
| 331451 ||  || — || August 10, 1996 || Haleakala || NEAT || — || align=right | 4.7 km || 
|-id=452 bgcolor=#d6d6d6
| 331452 ||  || — || May 24, 2001 || Apache Point || SDSS || — || align=right | 3.2 km || 
|-id=453 bgcolor=#d6d6d6
| 331453 ||  || — || August 20, 2002 || Palomar || NEAT || — || align=right | 5.0 km || 
|-id=454 bgcolor=#d6d6d6
| 331454 ||  || — || October 18, 2003 || Anderson Mesa || LONEOS || EOS || align=right | 2.4 km || 
|-id=455 bgcolor=#d6d6d6
| 331455 ||  || — || January 23, 2006 || Kitt Peak || Spacewatch || EOS || align=right | 2.5 km || 
|-id=456 bgcolor=#E9E9E9
| 331456 ||  || — || September 8, 1999 || Catalina || CSS || GEF || align=right | 1.7 km || 
|-id=457 bgcolor=#E9E9E9
| 331457 ||  || — || February 23, 2007 || Kitt Peak || Spacewatch || — || align=right | 1.9 km || 
|-id=458 bgcolor=#d6d6d6
| 331458 ||  || — || October 8, 2004 || Kitt Peak || Spacewatch || — || align=right | 2.1 km || 
|-id=459 bgcolor=#d6d6d6
| 331459 ||  || — || September 17, 2003 || Kitt Peak || Spacewatch || EOS || align=right | 2.6 km || 
|-id=460 bgcolor=#E9E9E9
| 331460 ||  || — || September 24, 2009 || Mount Lemmon || Mount Lemmon Survey || — || align=right | 2.5 km || 
|-id=461 bgcolor=#d6d6d6
| 331461 ||  || — || September 29, 2003 || Kitt Peak || Spacewatch || — || align=right | 3.1 km || 
|-id=462 bgcolor=#E9E9E9
| 331462 ||  || — || February 10, 1999 || Kitt Peak || Spacewatch || — || align=right | 1.1 km || 
|-id=463 bgcolor=#d6d6d6
| 331463 ||  || — || April 19, 2007 || Mount Lemmon || Mount Lemmon Survey || — || align=right | 3.2 km || 
|-id=464 bgcolor=#fefefe
| 331464 ||  || — || October 19, 2003 || Kitt Peak || Spacewatch || — || align=right data-sort-value="0.87" | 870 m || 
|-id=465 bgcolor=#d6d6d6
| 331465 ||  || — || May 11, 2007 || Mount Lemmon || Mount Lemmon Survey || TEL || align=right | 2.0 km || 
|-id=466 bgcolor=#E9E9E9
| 331466 ||  || — || November 12, 2001 || Apache Point || SDSS || — || align=right | 1.3 km || 
|-id=467 bgcolor=#fefefe
| 331467 ||  || — || October 16, 2006 || Catalina || CSS || — || align=right data-sort-value="0.99" | 990 m || 
|-id=468 bgcolor=#d6d6d6
| 331468 ||  || — || September 19, 2009 || Mount Lemmon || Mount Lemmon Survey || MEL || align=right | 4.3 km || 
|-id=469 bgcolor=#fefefe
| 331469 || 6006 P-L || — || September 24, 1960 || Palomar || PLS || FLO || align=right data-sort-value="0.77" | 770 m || 
|-id=470 bgcolor=#fefefe
| 331470 ||  || — || October 16, 1977 || Palomar || PLS || — || align=right data-sort-value="0.73" | 730 m || 
|-id=471 bgcolor=#FFC2E0
| 331471 ||  || — || August 27, 1984 || Palomar || E. F. Helin, P. Rose || APO +1km || align=right | 2.8 km || 
|-id=472 bgcolor=#E9E9E9
| 331472 ||  || — || January 21, 1993 || Kitt Peak || Spacewatch || MAR || align=right | 1.7 km || 
|-id=473 bgcolor=#E9E9E9
| 331473 ||  || — || October 9, 1993 || Kitt Peak || Spacewatch || HNA || align=right | 2.4 km || 
|-id=474 bgcolor=#fefefe
| 331474 ||  || — || August 10, 1994 || La Silla || E. W. Elst || — || align=right | 1.4 km || 
|-id=475 bgcolor=#E9E9E9
| 331475 ||  || — || September 18, 1995 || Kitt Peak || Spacewatch || — || align=right data-sort-value="0.66" | 660 m || 
|-id=476 bgcolor=#E9E9E9
| 331476 ||  || — || October 18, 1995 || Kitt Peak || Spacewatch || — || align=right | 1.9 km || 
|-id=477 bgcolor=#E9E9E9
| 331477 ||  || — || October 6, 1996 || Kitt Peak || Spacewatch || EUN || align=right | 1.7 km || 
|-id=478 bgcolor=#fefefe
| 331478 ||  || — || October 2, 1997 || Kitt Peak || Spacewatch || — || align=right | 1.1 km || 
|-id=479 bgcolor=#fefefe
| 331479 ||  || — || November 22, 1997 || Kitt Peak || Spacewatch || — || align=right data-sort-value="0.98" | 980 m || 
|-id=480 bgcolor=#E9E9E9
| 331480 ||  || — || November 23, 1997 || Kitt Peak || Spacewatch || — || align=right | 1.7 km || 
|-id=481 bgcolor=#E9E9E9
| 331481 ||  || — || May 27, 1998 || Kitt Peak || Spacewatch || — || align=right | 3.1 km || 
|-id=482 bgcolor=#fefefe
| 331482 ||  || — || September 14, 1998 || Socorro || LINEAR || — || align=right | 1.0 km || 
|-id=483 bgcolor=#d6d6d6
| 331483 ||  || — || September 25, 1998 || Kitt Peak || Spacewatch || 3:2 || align=right | 5.7 km || 
|-id=484 bgcolor=#FA8072
| 331484 ||  || — || October 18, 1998 || Catalina || CSS || PHO || align=right | 1.6 km || 
|-id=485 bgcolor=#fefefe
| 331485 ||  || — || November 15, 1998 || Kitt Peak || Spacewatch || — || align=right data-sort-value="0.80" | 800 m || 
|-id=486 bgcolor=#fefefe
| 331486 ||  || — || November 10, 1998 || Anderson Mesa || LONEOS || — || align=right | 1.5 km || 
|-id=487 bgcolor=#d6d6d6
| 331487 ||  || — || November 24, 1998 || Kitt Peak || Spacewatch || — || align=right | 2.7 km || 
|-id=488 bgcolor=#E9E9E9
| 331488 ||  || — || December 22, 1998 || Kitt Peak || Spacewatch || — || align=right | 1.1 km || 
|-id=489 bgcolor=#d6d6d6
| 331489 ||  || — || January 19, 1999 || Kitt Peak || Spacewatch || EOS || align=right | 2.3 km || 
|-id=490 bgcolor=#E9E9E9
| 331490 ||  || — || April 9, 1999 || Socorro || LINEAR || — || align=right | 1.7 km || 
|-id=491 bgcolor=#E9E9E9
| 331491 ||  || — || July 14, 1999 || Socorro || LINEAR || — || align=right | 2.0 km || 
|-id=492 bgcolor=#E9E9E9
| 331492 ||  || — || September 9, 1999 || Socorro || LINEAR || GEF || align=right | 1.6 km || 
|-id=493 bgcolor=#E9E9E9
| 331493 ||  || — || September 8, 1999 || Socorro || LINEAR || ADE || align=right | 3.2 km || 
|-id=494 bgcolor=#E9E9E9
| 331494 ||  || — || September 8, 1999 || Socorro || LINEAR || — || align=right | 3.4 km || 
|-id=495 bgcolor=#FA8072
| 331495 ||  || — || September 6, 1999 || Catalina || CSS || — || align=right data-sort-value="0.98" | 980 m || 
|-id=496 bgcolor=#E9E9E9
| 331496 ||  || — || September 8, 1999 || Socorro || LINEAR || INO || align=right | 1.6 km || 
|-id=497 bgcolor=#fefefe
| 331497 ||  || — || October 10, 1999 || Kitt Peak || Spacewatch || — || align=right data-sort-value="0.69" | 690 m || 
|-id=498 bgcolor=#E9E9E9
| 331498 ||  || — || October 15, 1999 || Socorro || LINEAR || — || align=right | 2.8 km || 
|-id=499 bgcolor=#E9E9E9
| 331499 ||  || — || October 10, 1999 || Socorro || LINEAR || INO || align=right | 1.7 km || 
|-id=500 bgcolor=#E9E9E9
| 331500 ||  || — || October 5, 1999 || Anderson Mesa || LONEOS || — || align=right | 3.4 km || 
|}

331501–331600 

|-bgcolor=#E9E9E9
| 331501 ||  || — || October 3, 1999 || Socorro || LINEAR || — || align=right | 4.4 km || 
|-id=502 bgcolor=#E9E9E9
| 331502 ||  || — || October 3, 1999 || Kitt Peak || Spacewatch || — || align=right | 3.1 km || 
|-id=503 bgcolor=#E9E9E9
| 331503 ||  || — || October 9, 1999 || Socorro || LINEAR || GEF || align=right | 1.4 km || 
|-id=504 bgcolor=#E9E9E9
| 331504 ||  || — || October 29, 1999 || Catalina || CSS || — || align=right | 3.0 km || 
|-id=505 bgcolor=#E9E9E9
| 331505 ||  || — || October 16, 1999 || Kitt Peak || Spacewatch || — || align=right | 2.1 km || 
|-id=506 bgcolor=#FA8072
| 331506 ||  || — || November 10, 1999 || Fountain Hills || C. W. Juels || — || align=right | 2.3 km || 
|-id=507 bgcolor=#E9E9E9
| 331507 ||  || — || December 5, 1999 || Catalina || CSS || — || align=right | 3.9 km || 
|-id=508 bgcolor=#d6d6d6
| 331508 ||  || — || December 8, 1999 || Socorro || LINEAR || SAN || align=right | 2.0 km || 
|-id=509 bgcolor=#FFC2E0
| 331509 ||  || — || December 16, 1999 || Socorro || LINEAR || AMO +1km || align=right data-sort-value="0.81" | 810 m || 
|-id=510 bgcolor=#FFC2E0
| 331510 ||  || — || January 4, 2000 || Socorro || LINEAR || AMO +1km || align=right | 1.1 km || 
|-id=511 bgcolor=#d6d6d6
| 331511 ||  || — || January 9, 2000 || Kitt Peak || Spacewatch || — || align=right | 3.8 km || 
|-id=512 bgcolor=#fefefe
| 331512 ||  || — || January 30, 2000 || Kitt Peak || Spacewatch || — || align=right data-sort-value="0.91" | 910 m || 
|-id=513 bgcolor=#d6d6d6
| 331513 ||  || — || January 11, 2000 || Socorro || LINEAR || — || align=right | 3.5 km || 
|-id=514 bgcolor=#E9E9E9
| 331514 ||  || — || February 29, 2000 || Socorro || LINEAR || — || align=right | 1.3 km || 
|-id=515 bgcolor=#d6d6d6
| 331515 ||  || — || February 28, 2000 || Socorro || LINEAR || — || align=right | 5.4 km || 
|-id=516 bgcolor=#d6d6d6
| 331516 ||  || — || March 4, 2000 || Socorro || LINEAR || — || align=right | 3.8 km || 
|-id=517 bgcolor=#d6d6d6
| 331517 ||  || — || March 27, 2000 || Kitt Peak || Spacewatch || HYG || align=right | 2.5 km || 
|-id=518 bgcolor=#fefefe
| 331518 ||  || — || May 7, 2000 || Socorro || LINEAR || — || align=right | 1.6 km || 
|-id=519 bgcolor=#E9E9E9
| 331519 ||  || — || July 5, 2000 || Anderson Mesa || LONEOS || — || align=right | 1.1 km || 
|-id=520 bgcolor=#E9E9E9
| 331520 ||  || — || August 26, 2000 || Socorro || LINEAR || — || align=right | 2.9 km || 
|-id=521 bgcolor=#FA8072
| 331521 ||  || — || August 24, 2000 || Socorro || LINEAR || — || align=right data-sort-value="0.81" | 810 m || 
|-id=522 bgcolor=#FA8072
| 331522 ||  || — || August 24, 2000 || Socorro || LINEAR || — || align=right | 1.2 km || 
|-id=523 bgcolor=#E9E9E9
| 331523 ||  || — || August 29, 2000 || Socorro || LINEAR || — || align=right | 2.0 km || 
|-id=524 bgcolor=#E9E9E9
| 331524 ||  || — || September 1, 2000 || Socorro || LINEAR || — || align=right | 1.6 km || 
|-id=525 bgcolor=#E9E9E9
| 331525 ||  || — || September 5, 2000 || Anderson Mesa || LONEOS || — || align=right | 1.5 km || 
|-id=526 bgcolor=#fefefe
| 331526 ||  || — || September 22, 2000 || Socorro || LINEAR || PHO || align=right | 1.2 km || 
|-id=527 bgcolor=#E9E9E9
| 331527 ||  || — || September 24, 2000 || Socorro || LINEAR || — || align=right | 1.3 km || 
|-id=528 bgcolor=#E9E9E9
| 331528 ||  || — || September 23, 2000 || Socorro || LINEAR || — || align=right | 1.4 km || 
|-id=529 bgcolor=#E9E9E9
| 331529 ||  || — || September 24, 2000 || Socorro || LINEAR || — || align=right | 2.6 km || 
|-id=530 bgcolor=#E9E9E9
| 331530 ||  || — || September 23, 2000 || Socorro || LINEAR || JUN || align=right | 1.5 km || 
|-id=531 bgcolor=#E9E9E9
| 331531 ||  || — || September 24, 2000 || Socorro || LINEAR || — || align=right | 2.2 km || 
|-id=532 bgcolor=#E9E9E9
| 331532 ||  || — || September 24, 2000 || Socorro || LINEAR || — || align=right | 1.3 km || 
|-id=533 bgcolor=#E9E9E9
| 331533 ||  || — || September 24, 2000 || Socorro || LINEAR || — || align=right | 1.9 km || 
|-id=534 bgcolor=#E9E9E9
| 331534 ||  || — || September 24, 2000 || Socorro || LINEAR || — || align=right | 1.3 km || 
|-id=535 bgcolor=#E9E9E9
| 331535 ||  || — || September 28, 2000 || Socorro || LINEAR || — || align=right | 2.0 km || 
|-id=536 bgcolor=#E9E9E9
| 331536 ||  || — || September 23, 2000 || Socorro || LINEAR || — || align=right | 1.8 km || 
|-id=537 bgcolor=#E9E9E9
| 331537 ||  || — || September 28, 2000 || Socorro || LINEAR || MAR || align=right | 1.6 km || 
|-id=538 bgcolor=#E9E9E9
| 331538 ||  || — || September 24, 2000 || Socorro || LINEAR || — || align=right | 1.7 km || 
|-id=539 bgcolor=#E9E9E9
| 331539 ||  || — || September 30, 2000 || Anderson Mesa || LONEOS || — || align=right | 1.8 km || 
|-id=540 bgcolor=#E9E9E9
| 331540 ||  || — || September 30, 2000 || Anderson Mesa || LONEOS || GER || align=right | 2.0 km || 
|-id=541 bgcolor=#E9E9E9
| 331541 ||  || — || September 29, 2000 || Anderson Mesa || LONEOS || EUN || align=right | 1.7 km || 
|-id=542 bgcolor=#E9E9E9
| 331542 ||  || — || October 6, 2000 || Anderson Mesa || LONEOS || — || align=right | 1.6 km || 
|-id=543 bgcolor=#E9E9E9
| 331543 ||  || — || October 6, 2000 || Anderson Mesa || LONEOS || — || align=right | 4.6 km || 
|-id=544 bgcolor=#E9E9E9
| 331544 ||  || — || October 1, 2000 || Socorro || LINEAR || — || align=right | 1.7 km || 
|-id=545 bgcolor=#E9E9E9
| 331545 ||  || — || October 25, 2000 || Socorro || LINEAR || — || align=right | 2.9 km || 
|-id=546 bgcolor=#E9E9E9
| 331546 ||  || — || October 25, 2000 || Socorro || LINEAR || — || align=right | 2.6 km || 
|-id=547 bgcolor=#E9E9E9
| 331547 ||  || — || November 1, 2000 || Socorro || LINEAR || — || align=right | 1.2 km || 
|-id=548 bgcolor=#FA8072
| 331548 ||  || — || November 1, 2000 || Socorro || LINEAR || — || align=right | 3.4 km || 
|-id=549 bgcolor=#fefefe
| 331549 ||  || — || November 21, 2000 || Socorro || LINEAR || — || align=right data-sort-value="0.91" | 910 m || 
|-id=550 bgcolor=#fefefe
| 331550 ||  || — || November 27, 2000 || Kitt Peak || Spacewatch || — || align=right data-sort-value="0.85" | 850 m || 
|-id=551 bgcolor=#FA8072
| 331551 ||  || — || November 20, 2000 || Socorro || LINEAR || — || align=right | 1.8 km || 
|-id=552 bgcolor=#E9E9E9
| 331552 ||  || — || November 28, 2000 || Kitt Peak || Spacewatch || — || align=right | 2.2 km || 
|-id=553 bgcolor=#E9E9E9
| 331553 ||  || — || November 19, 2000 || Socorro || LINEAR || — || align=right | 1.6 km || 
|-id=554 bgcolor=#E9E9E9
| 331554 ||  || — || November 20, 2000 || Anderson Mesa || LONEOS || — || align=right | 2.0 km || 
|-id=555 bgcolor=#fefefe
| 331555 ||  || — || December 1, 2000 || Socorro || LINEAR || H || align=right | 2.6 km || 
|-id=556 bgcolor=#fefefe
| 331556 ||  || — || December 15, 2000 || Uccle || T. Pauwels || — || align=right data-sort-value="0.87" | 870 m || 
|-id=557 bgcolor=#E9E9E9
| 331557 ||  || — || December 20, 2000 || Uccle || T. Pauwels || — || align=right | 1.8 km || 
|-id=558 bgcolor=#E9E9E9
| 331558 ||  || — || January 19, 2001 || Socorro || LINEAR || — || align=right | 5.6 km || 
|-id=559 bgcolor=#E9E9E9
| 331559 ||  || — || February 17, 2001 || Socorro || LINEAR || DOR || align=right | 3.5 km || 
|-id=560 bgcolor=#fefefe
| 331560 ||  || — || April 29, 2001 || Kitt Peak || Spacewatch || — || align=right data-sort-value="0.76" | 760 m || 
|-id=561 bgcolor=#fefefe
| 331561 ||  || — || May 21, 2001 || Socorro || LINEAR || — || align=right | 1.0 km || 
|-id=562 bgcolor=#d6d6d6
| 331562 ||  || — || June 23, 2001 || Palomar || NEAT || — || align=right | 4.1 km || 
|-id=563 bgcolor=#d6d6d6
| 331563 ||  || — || July 17, 2001 || Haleakala || NEAT || — || align=right | 4.9 km || 
|-id=564 bgcolor=#fefefe
| 331564 ||  || — || July 18, 2001 || Palomar || NEAT || SVE || align=right | 2.5 km || 
|-id=565 bgcolor=#d6d6d6
| 331565 ||  || — || July 23, 2001 || Palomar || NEAT || — || align=right | 4.2 km || 
|-id=566 bgcolor=#fefefe
| 331566 ||  || — || August 8, 2001 || Haleakala || NEAT || — || align=right | 1.3 km || 
|-id=567 bgcolor=#d6d6d6
| 331567 ||  || — || August 14, 2001 || Haleakala || NEAT || — || align=right | 3.4 km || 
|-id=568 bgcolor=#d6d6d6
| 331568 ||  || — || August 16, 2001 || Socorro || LINEAR || — || align=right | 4.2 km || 
|-id=569 bgcolor=#fefefe
| 331569 ||  || — || August 16, 2001 || Socorro || LINEAR || NYS || align=right | 1.0 km || 
|-id=570 bgcolor=#fefefe
| 331570 ||  || — || August 19, 2001 || Socorro || LINEAR || — || align=right | 1.6 km || 
|-id=571 bgcolor=#d6d6d6
| 331571 ||  || — || August 19, 2001 || Socorro || LINEAR || — || align=right | 3.4 km || 
|-id=572 bgcolor=#fefefe
| 331572 ||  || — || August 24, 2001 || Haleakala || NEAT || — || align=right | 1.1 km || 
|-id=573 bgcolor=#fefefe
| 331573 ||  || — || August 22, 2001 || Palomar || NEAT || LCI || align=right | 1.6 km || 
|-id=574 bgcolor=#fefefe
| 331574 ||  || — || August 24, 2001 || Anderson Mesa || LONEOS || V || align=right data-sort-value="0.87" | 870 m || 
|-id=575 bgcolor=#fefefe
| 331575 ||  || — || August 24, 2001 || Anderson Mesa || LONEOS || — || align=right | 1.3 km || 
|-id=576 bgcolor=#d6d6d6
| 331576 ||  || — || August 26, 2001 || Anderson Mesa || LONEOS || — || align=right | 4.3 km || 
|-id=577 bgcolor=#d6d6d6
| 331577 ||  || — || August 19, 2001 || Socorro || LINEAR || — || align=right | 5.0 km || 
|-id=578 bgcolor=#d6d6d6
| 331578 ||  || — || September 10, 2001 || Socorro || LINEAR || — || align=right | 4.8 km || 
|-id=579 bgcolor=#d6d6d6
| 331579 ||  || — || September 10, 2001 || Socorro || LINEAR || THB || align=right | 4.7 km || 
|-id=580 bgcolor=#fefefe
| 331580 ||  || — || September 11, 2001 || Anderson Mesa || LONEOS || NYS || align=right data-sort-value="0.69" | 690 m || 
|-id=581 bgcolor=#fefefe
| 331581 ||  || — || September 16, 2001 || Socorro || LINEAR || NYS || align=right data-sort-value="0.85" | 850 m || 
|-id=582 bgcolor=#fefefe
| 331582 ||  || — || September 20, 2001 || Socorro || LINEAR || — || align=right data-sort-value="0.85" | 850 m || 
|-id=583 bgcolor=#E9E9E9
| 331583 ||  || — || September 16, 2001 || Socorro || LINEAR || — || align=right | 3.2 km || 
|-id=584 bgcolor=#fefefe
| 331584 ||  || — || September 16, 2001 || Socorro || LINEAR || — || align=right | 1.0 km || 
|-id=585 bgcolor=#fefefe
| 331585 ||  || — || September 16, 2001 || Socorro || LINEAR || — || align=right | 1.1 km || 
|-id=586 bgcolor=#d6d6d6
| 331586 ||  || — || September 19, 2001 || Socorro || LINEAR || HYG || align=right | 3.1 km || 
|-id=587 bgcolor=#FA8072
| 331587 ||  || — || October 9, 2001 || Socorro || LINEAR || Tj (2.91) || align=right | 4.0 km || 
|-id=588 bgcolor=#d6d6d6
| 331588 ||  || — || October 13, 2001 || Socorro || LINEAR || — || align=right | 4.0 km || 
|-id=589 bgcolor=#fefefe
| 331589 ||  || — || October 14, 2001 || Socorro || LINEAR || H || align=right data-sort-value="0.97" | 970 m || 
|-id=590 bgcolor=#fefefe
| 331590 ||  || — || October 12, 2001 || Haleakala || NEAT || — || align=right | 1.1 km || 
|-id=591 bgcolor=#d6d6d6
| 331591 ||  || — || October 15, 2001 || Haleakala || NEAT || — || align=right | 6.5 km || 
|-id=592 bgcolor=#d6d6d6
| 331592 ||  || — || October 14, 2001 || Apache Point || SDSS || — || align=right | 2.3 km || 
|-id=593 bgcolor=#E9E9E9
| 331593 ||  || — || October 17, 2001 || Socorro || LINEAR || — || align=right | 1.5 km || 
|-id=594 bgcolor=#E9E9E9
| 331594 ||  || — || October 20, 2001 || Socorro || LINEAR || — || align=right | 1.7 km || 
|-id=595 bgcolor=#fefefe
| 331595 ||  || — || October 20, 2001 || Kitt Peak || Spacewatch || NYS || align=right data-sort-value="0.63" | 630 m || 
|-id=596 bgcolor=#fefefe
| 331596 ||  || — || October 24, 2001 || Socorro || LINEAR || — || align=right | 1.1 km || 
|-id=597 bgcolor=#d6d6d6
| 331597 ||  || — || November 10, 2001 || Socorro || LINEAR || EUP || align=right | 4.4 km || 
|-id=598 bgcolor=#E9E9E9
| 331598 ||  || — || November 9, 2001 || Socorro || LINEAR || — || align=right | 1.2 km || 
|-id=599 bgcolor=#E9E9E9
| 331599 ||  || — || November 10, 2001 || Palomar || NEAT || HNS || align=right | 1.9 km || 
|-id=600 bgcolor=#fefefe
| 331600 ||  || — || November 12, 2001 || Socorro || LINEAR || — || align=right | 1.7 km || 
|}

331601–331700 

|-bgcolor=#fefefe
| 331601 ||  || — || November 17, 2001 || Socorro || LINEAR || NYS || align=right data-sort-value="0.80" | 800 m || 
|-id=602 bgcolor=#fefefe
| 331602 ||  || — || November 20, 2001 || Socorro || LINEAR || — || align=right | 1.0 km || 
|-id=603 bgcolor=#d6d6d6
| 331603 ||  || — || October 14, 2001 || Socorro || LINEAR || EUP || align=right | 3.8 km || 
|-id=604 bgcolor=#E9E9E9
| 331604 ||  || — || October 18, 2001 || Kitt Peak || Spacewatch || — || align=right | 1.8 km || 
|-id=605 bgcolor=#E9E9E9
| 331605 ||  || — || December 10, 2001 || Uccle || T. Pauwels || — || align=right | 2.2 km || 
|-id=606 bgcolor=#E9E9E9
| 331606 ||  || — || December 9, 2001 || Socorro || LINEAR || — || align=right | 2.5 km || 
|-id=607 bgcolor=#E9E9E9
| 331607 ||  || — || December 10, 2001 || Socorro || LINEAR || — || align=right | 1.4 km || 
|-id=608 bgcolor=#E9E9E9
| 331608 ||  || — || December 11, 2001 || Socorro || LINEAR || — || align=right | 2.2 km || 
|-id=609 bgcolor=#E9E9E9
| 331609 ||  || — || December 14, 2001 || Socorro || LINEAR || — || align=right | 1.9 km || 
|-id=610 bgcolor=#E9E9E9
| 331610 ||  || — || December 15, 2001 || Socorro || LINEAR || — || align=right | 4.0 km || 
|-id=611 bgcolor=#E9E9E9
| 331611 ||  || — || December 14, 2001 || Socorro || LINEAR || — || align=right | 2.0 km || 
|-id=612 bgcolor=#fefefe
| 331612 ||  || — || December 18, 2001 || Socorro || LINEAR || NYS || align=right | 1.0 km || 
|-id=613 bgcolor=#E9E9E9
| 331613 ||  || — || December 18, 2001 || Socorro || LINEAR || — || align=right | 2.4 km || 
|-id=614 bgcolor=#FA8072
| 331614 ||  || — || December 22, 2001 || Socorro || LINEAR || PHO || align=right | 2.0 km || 
|-id=615 bgcolor=#E9E9E9
| 331615 ||  || — || January 9, 2002 || Socorro || LINEAR || MIT || align=right | 3.1 km || 
|-id=616 bgcolor=#E9E9E9
| 331616 ||  || — || January 9, 2002 || Socorro || LINEAR || HNS || align=right | 1.6 km || 
|-id=617 bgcolor=#E9E9E9
| 331617 ||  || — || January 13, 2002 || Kitt Peak || Spacewatch || WIT || align=right | 1.0 km || 
|-id=618 bgcolor=#E9E9E9
| 331618 ||  || — || January 9, 2002 || Socorro || LINEAR || — || align=right | 2.3 km || 
|-id=619 bgcolor=#E9E9E9
| 331619 ||  || — || January 9, 2002 || Socorro || LINEAR || — || align=right | 1.4 km || 
|-id=620 bgcolor=#E9E9E9
| 331620 ||  || — || January 8, 2002 || Socorro || LINEAR || — || align=right | 1.2 km || 
|-id=621 bgcolor=#E9E9E9
| 331621 ||  || — || February 4, 2002 || Haleakala || NEAT || — || align=right | 3.0 km || 
|-id=622 bgcolor=#E9E9E9
| 331622 ||  || — || January 14, 2002 || Socorro || LINEAR || GEF || align=right | 1.6 km || 
|-id=623 bgcolor=#E9E9E9
| 331623 ||  || — || February 7, 2002 || Socorro || LINEAR || HNS || align=right | 1.4 km || 
|-id=624 bgcolor=#E9E9E9
| 331624 ||  || — || February 10, 2002 || Socorro || LINEAR || — || align=right | 2.4 km || 
|-id=625 bgcolor=#E9E9E9
| 331625 ||  || — || February 8, 2002 || Palomar || NEAT || MIT || align=right | 3.6 km || 
|-id=626 bgcolor=#E9E9E9
| 331626 ||  || — || February 16, 2002 || Haleakala || NEAT || — || align=right | 2.1 km || 
|-id=627 bgcolor=#E9E9E9
| 331627 ||  || — || March 13, 2002 || Socorro || LINEAR || — || align=right | 3.5 km || 
|-id=628 bgcolor=#E9E9E9
| 331628 ||  || — || February 8, 2002 || Anderson Mesa || LONEOS || — || align=right | 2.9 km || 
|-id=629 bgcolor=#d6d6d6
| 331629 ||  || — || April 6, 2002 || Cerro Tololo || M. W. Buie || — || align=right | 2.9 km || 
|-id=630 bgcolor=#fefefe
| 331630 ||  || — || April 8, 2002 || Palomar || NEAT || MAS || align=right data-sort-value="0.80" | 800 m || 
|-id=631 bgcolor=#d6d6d6
| 331631 ||  || — || April 8, 2002 || Palomar || NEAT || BRA || align=right | 2.1 km || 
|-id=632 bgcolor=#fefefe
| 331632 ||  || — || April 11, 2002 || Socorro || LINEAR || — || align=right data-sort-value="0.98" | 980 m || 
|-id=633 bgcolor=#E9E9E9
| 331633 ||  || — || April 12, 2002 || Kitt Peak || Spacewatch || — || align=right | 3.4 km || 
|-id=634 bgcolor=#E9E9E9
| 331634 ||  || — || April 12, 2002 || Palomar || NEAT || — || align=right | 2.4 km || 
|-id=635 bgcolor=#E9E9E9
| 331635 ||  || — || April 14, 2002 || Palomar || NEAT || AGN || align=right | 1.2 km || 
|-id=636 bgcolor=#E9E9E9
| 331636 ||  || — || May 4, 2002 || Palomar || NEAT || — || align=right | 1.5 km || 
|-id=637 bgcolor=#fefefe
| 331637 ||  || — || May 6, 2002 || Socorro || LINEAR || H || align=right data-sort-value="0.97" | 970 m || 
|-id=638 bgcolor=#d6d6d6
| 331638 ||  || — || May 6, 2002 || Palomar || NEAT || — || align=right | 2.7 km || 
|-id=639 bgcolor=#d6d6d6
| 331639 ||  || — || July 8, 2002 || Palomar || NEAT || — || align=right | 6.0 km || 
|-id=640 bgcolor=#d6d6d6
| 331640 ||  || — || July 10, 2002 || Campo Imperatore || CINEOS || — || align=right | 3.2 km || 
|-id=641 bgcolor=#d6d6d6
| 331641 ||  || — || July 9, 2002 || Socorro || LINEAR || — || align=right | 4.7 km || 
|-id=642 bgcolor=#d6d6d6
| 331642 ||  || — || July 9, 2002 || Socorro || LINEAR || — || align=right | 4.2 km || 
|-id=643 bgcolor=#fefefe
| 331643 ||  || — || July 14, 2002 || Socorro || LINEAR || — || align=right data-sort-value="0.65" | 650 m || 
|-id=644 bgcolor=#fefefe
| 331644 ||  || — || July 12, 2002 || Palomar || NEAT || — || align=right data-sort-value="0.78" | 780 m || 
|-id=645 bgcolor=#fefefe
| 331645 ||  || — || July 14, 2002 || Palomar || NEAT || FLO || align=right data-sort-value="0.58" | 580 m || 
|-id=646 bgcolor=#d6d6d6
| 331646 ||  || — || July 8, 2002 || Palomar || NEAT || — || align=right | 3.8 km || 
|-id=647 bgcolor=#E9E9E9
| 331647 ||  || — || October 23, 2003 || Kitt Peak || Spacewatch || WIT || align=right | 1.5 km || 
|-id=648 bgcolor=#d6d6d6
| 331648 ||  || — || July 17, 2002 || Palomar || NEAT || — || align=right | 5.5 km || 
|-id=649 bgcolor=#d6d6d6
| 331649 ||  || — || July 20, 2002 || Palomar || NEAT || — || align=right | 3.6 km || 
|-id=650 bgcolor=#d6d6d6
| 331650 ||  || — || July 22, 2002 || Palomar || NEAT || — || align=right | 2.7 km || 
|-id=651 bgcolor=#fefefe
| 331651 ||  || — || August 3, 2002 || Palomar || NEAT || — || align=right data-sort-value="0.96" | 960 m || 
|-id=652 bgcolor=#d6d6d6
| 331652 ||  || — || August 4, 2002 || Palomar || NEAT || — || align=right | 3.7 km || 
|-id=653 bgcolor=#E9E9E9
| 331653 ||  || — || August 5, 2002 || Palomar || NEAT || — || align=right | 1.5 km || 
|-id=654 bgcolor=#E9E9E9
| 331654 ||  || — || August 6, 2002 || Palomar || NEAT || — || align=right | 2.5 km || 
|-id=655 bgcolor=#d6d6d6
| 331655 ||  || — || August 6, 2002 || Palomar || NEAT || — || align=right | 3.3 km || 
|-id=656 bgcolor=#d6d6d6
| 331656 ||  || — || August 6, 2002 || Palomar || NEAT || — || align=right | 2.7 km || 
|-id=657 bgcolor=#fefefe
| 331657 ||  || — || August 5, 2002 || Campo Imperatore || CINEOS || FLO || align=right data-sort-value="0.61" | 610 m || 
|-id=658 bgcolor=#d6d6d6
| 331658 ||  || — || August 6, 2002 || Palomar || NEAT || EOS || align=right | 2.4 km || 
|-id=659 bgcolor=#d6d6d6
| 331659 ||  || — || August 11, 2002 || Socorro || LINEAR || — || align=right | 4.4 km || 
|-id=660 bgcolor=#fefefe
| 331660 ||  || — || August 12, 2002 || Socorro || LINEAR || — || align=right data-sort-value="0.71" | 710 m || 
|-id=661 bgcolor=#d6d6d6
| 331661 ||  || — || August 12, 2002 || Socorro || LINEAR || — || align=right | 2.7 km || 
|-id=662 bgcolor=#d6d6d6
| 331662 ||  || — || August 12, 2002 || Socorro || LINEAR || — || align=right | 4.3 km || 
|-id=663 bgcolor=#fefefe
| 331663 ||  || — || August 12, 2002 || Socorro || LINEAR || — || align=right | 1.1 km || 
|-id=664 bgcolor=#d6d6d6
| 331664 ||  || — || August 12, 2002 || Socorro || LINEAR || — || align=right | 3.2 km || 
|-id=665 bgcolor=#d6d6d6
| 331665 ||  || — || August 15, 2002 || Palomar || NEAT || — || align=right | 3.7 km || 
|-id=666 bgcolor=#d6d6d6
| 331666 ||  || — || August 11, 2002 || Socorro || LINEAR || — || align=right | 3.6 km || 
|-id=667 bgcolor=#fefefe
| 331667 ||  || — || August 8, 2002 || Palomar || S. F. Hönig || — || align=right | 1.00 km || 
|-id=668 bgcolor=#d6d6d6
| 331668 ||  || — || August 8, 2002 || Palomar || NEAT || — || align=right | 3.5 km || 
|-id=669 bgcolor=#d6d6d6
| 331669 ||  || — || August 8, 2002 || Palomar || NEAT || EOS || align=right | 1.9 km || 
|-id=670 bgcolor=#fefefe
| 331670 ||  || — || August 15, 2002 || Palomar || NEAT || V || align=right data-sort-value="0.64" | 640 m || 
|-id=671 bgcolor=#d6d6d6
| 331671 ||  || — || August 15, 2002 || Palomar || NEAT || — || align=right | 3.4 km || 
|-id=672 bgcolor=#d6d6d6
| 331672 ||  || — || August 15, 2002 || Palomar || NEAT || — || align=right | 2.8 km || 
|-id=673 bgcolor=#fefefe
| 331673 ||  || — || August 8, 2002 || Palomar || NEAT || — || align=right data-sort-value="0.85" | 850 m || 
|-id=674 bgcolor=#d6d6d6
| 331674 ||  || — || August 8, 2002 || Palomar || NEAT || — || align=right | 3.3 km || 
|-id=675 bgcolor=#E9E9E9
| 331675 ||  || — || February 3, 2009 || Mount Lemmon || Mount Lemmon Survey || HNS || align=right | 1.0 km || 
|-id=676 bgcolor=#fefefe
| 331676 ||  || — || February 2, 2008 || Kitt Peak || Spacewatch || — || align=right data-sort-value="0.86" | 860 m || 
|-id=677 bgcolor=#d6d6d6
| 331677 ||  || — || July 29, 2008 || Kitt Peak || Spacewatch || — || align=right | 3.3 km || 
|-id=678 bgcolor=#fefefe
| 331678 ||  || — || August 20, 2002 || Kvistaberg || UDAS || FLO || align=right data-sort-value="0.67" | 670 m || 
|-id=679 bgcolor=#d6d6d6
| 331679 ||  || — || August 26, 2002 || Palomar || NEAT || — || align=right | 3.5 km || 
|-id=680 bgcolor=#d6d6d6
| 331680 ||  || — || August 28, 2002 || Socorro || LINEAR || Tj (2.99) || align=right | 4.8 km || 
|-id=681 bgcolor=#fefefe
| 331681 ||  || — || August 17, 2002 || Palomar || NEAT || critical || align=right data-sort-value="0.71" | 710 m || 
|-id=682 bgcolor=#fefefe
| 331682 ||  || — || August 17, 2002 || Palomar || NEAT || — || align=right data-sort-value="0.75" | 750 m || 
|-id=683 bgcolor=#E9E9E9
| 331683 ||  || — || December 20, 2004 || Mount Lemmon || Mount Lemmon Survey || — || align=right | 2.3 km || 
|-id=684 bgcolor=#d6d6d6
| 331684 ||  || — || August 30, 2002 || Palomar || NEAT || — || align=right | 4.1 km || 
|-id=685 bgcolor=#fefefe
| 331685 ||  || — || August 28, 2002 || Palomar || NEAT || — || align=right data-sort-value="0.58" | 580 m || 
|-id=686 bgcolor=#d6d6d6
| 331686 ||  || — || August 16, 2002 || Palomar || NEAT || — || align=right | 3.5 km || 
|-id=687 bgcolor=#fefefe
| 331687 ||  || — || August 26, 2002 || Palomar || NEAT || — || align=right data-sort-value="0.72" | 720 m || 
|-id=688 bgcolor=#d6d6d6
| 331688 ||  || — || August 16, 2002 || Palomar || NEAT || — || align=right | 4.4 km || 
|-id=689 bgcolor=#fefefe
| 331689 ||  || — || August 29, 2002 || Palomar || NEAT || — || align=right data-sort-value="0.77" | 770 m || 
|-id=690 bgcolor=#fefefe
| 331690 ||  || — || August 17, 2002 || Palomar || NEAT || PHO || align=right data-sort-value="0.97" | 970 m || 
|-id=691 bgcolor=#d6d6d6
| 331691 ||  || — || August 16, 2002 || Palomar || NEAT || — || align=right | 2.8 km || 
|-id=692 bgcolor=#d6d6d6
| 331692 ||  || — || August 18, 2002 || Palomar || NEAT || EOS || align=right | 2.4 km || 
|-id=693 bgcolor=#d6d6d6
| 331693 ||  || — || August 30, 2002 || Palomar || NEAT || — || align=right | 4.7 km || 
|-id=694 bgcolor=#d6d6d6
| 331694 ||  || — || November 24, 2003 || Kitt Peak || Spacewatch || — || align=right | 3.9 km || 
|-id=695 bgcolor=#d6d6d6
| 331695 ||  || — || September 30, 2008 || Catalina || CSS || VER || align=right | 3.3 km || 
|-id=696 bgcolor=#fefefe
| 331696 ||  || — || October 4, 2006 || Mount Lemmon || Mount Lemmon Survey || FLO || align=right data-sort-value="0.73" | 730 m || 
|-id=697 bgcolor=#d6d6d6
| 331697 ||  || — || September 3, 2002 || Palomar || NEAT || — || align=right | 6.3 km || 
|-id=698 bgcolor=#d6d6d6
| 331698 ||  || — || September 5, 2002 || Socorro || LINEAR || — || align=right | 3.2 km || 
|-id=699 bgcolor=#FA8072
| 331699 ||  || — || September 5, 2002 || Socorro || LINEAR || — || align=right data-sort-value="0.98" | 980 m || 
|-id=700 bgcolor=#fefefe
| 331700 ||  || — || September 5, 2002 || Socorro || LINEAR || — || align=right data-sort-value="0.84" | 840 m || 
|}

331701–331800 

|-bgcolor=#fefefe
| 331701 ||  || — || September 5, 2002 || Anderson Mesa || LONEOS || V || align=right data-sort-value="0.87" | 870 m || 
|-id=702 bgcolor=#d6d6d6
| 331702 ||  || — || September 4, 2002 || Anderson Mesa || LONEOS || — || align=right | 3.5 km || 
|-id=703 bgcolor=#d6d6d6
| 331703 ||  || — || September 4, 2002 || Palomar || NEAT || — || align=right | 2.8 km || 
|-id=704 bgcolor=#d6d6d6
| 331704 ||  || — || September 5, 2002 || Socorro || LINEAR || — || align=right | 2.9 km || 
|-id=705 bgcolor=#fefefe
| 331705 ||  || — || September 5, 2002 || Socorro || LINEAR || NYS || align=right data-sort-value="0.76" | 760 m || 
|-id=706 bgcolor=#d6d6d6
| 331706 ||  || — || September 5, 2002 || Socorro || LINEAR || — || align=right | 3.2 km || 
|-id=707 bgcolor=#fefefe
| 331707 ||  || — || September 5, 2002 || Socorro || LINEAR || ERI || align=right | 2.1 km || 
|-id=708 bgcolor=#fefefe
| 331708 ||  || — || September 11, 2002 || Palomar || NEAT || V || align=right data-sort-value="0.65" | 650 m || 
|-id=709 bgcolor=#d6d6d6
| 331709 ||  || — || September 12, 2002 || Palomar || NEAT || — || align=right | 3.8 km || 
|-id=710 bgcolor=#d6d6d6
| 331710 ||  || — || September 12, 2002 || Palomar || NEAT || — || align=right | 3.7 km || 
|-id=711 bgcolor=#d6d6d6
| 331711 ||  || — || September 12, 2002 || Palomar || NEAT || — || align=right | 4.5 km || 
|-id=712 bgcolor=#d6d6d6
| 331712 ||  || — || September 13, 2002 || Anderson Mesa || LONEOS || — || align=right | 4.1 km || 
|-id=713 bgcolor=#fefefe
| 331713 ||  || — || September 14, 2002 || Palomar || R. Matson || FLO || align=right data-sort-value="0.60" | 600 m || 
|-id=714 bgcolor=#E9E9E9
| 331714 ||  || — || March 8, 2005 || Mount Lemmon || Mount Lemmon Survey || AER || align=right | 1.3 km || 
|-id=715 bgcolor=#d6d6d6
| 331715 ||  || — || September 15, 2002 || Palomar || NEAT || — || align=right | 2.6 km || 
|-id=716 bgcolor=#d6d6d6
| 331716 ||  || — || March 5, 2006 || Kitt Peak || Spacewatch || — || align=right | 3.9 km || 
|-id=717 bgcolor=#d6d6d6
| 331717 ||  || — || January 17, 2005 || Kitt Peak || Spacewatch || EOS || align=right | 2.3 km || 
|-id=718 bgcolor=#E9E9E9
| 331718 ||  || — || August 16, 2002 || Kitt Peak || Spacewatch || GEF || align=right | 1.1 km || 
|-id=719 bgcolor=#fefefe
| 331719 ||  || — || September 30, 2002 || Socorro || LINEAR || — || align=right data-sort-value="0.96" | 960 m || 
|-id=720 bgcolor=#d6d6d6
| 331720 ||  || — || September 16, 2002 || Palomar || NEAT || HYG || align=right | 3.8 km || 
|-id=721 bgcolor=#d6d6d6
| 331721 ||  || — || September 16, 2002 || Palomar || NEAT || — || align=right | 4.7 km || 
|-id=722 bgcolor=#FA8072
| 331722 ||  || — || October 1, 2002 || Anderson Mesa || LONEOS || — || align=right | 1.2 km || 
|-id=723 bgcolor=#d6d6d6
| 331723 ||  || — || October 3, 2002 || Palomar || NEAT || — || align=right | 4.2 km || 
|-id=724 bgcolor=#fefefe
| 331724 ||  || — || October 3, 2002 || Palomar || NEAT || V || align=right data-sort-value="0.95" | 950 m || 
|-id=725 bgcolor=#d6d6d6
| 331725 ||  || — || September 17, 2002 || Haleakala || NEAT || — || align=right | 4.3 km || 
|-id=726 bgcolor=#fefefe
| 331726 ||  || — || October 3, 2002 || Palomar || NEAT || — || align=right | 1.2 km || 
|-id=727 bgcolor=#fefefe
| 331727 ||  || — || October 3, 2002 || Socorro || LINEAR || — || align=right | 1.3 km || 
|-id=728 bgcolor=#d6d6d6
| 331728 ||  || — || October 4, 2002 || Socorro || LINEAR || URS || align=right | 3.8 km || 
|-id=729 bgcolor=#d6d6d6
| 331729 ||  || — || October 3, 2002 || Socorro || LINEAR || TIR || align=right | 4.0 km || 
|-id=730 bgcolor=#d6d6d6
| 331730 ||  || — || October 4, 2002 || Palomar || NEAT || — || align=right | 4.4 km || 
|-id=731 bgcolor=#fefefe
| 331731 ||  || — || October 4, 2002 || Socorro || LINEAR || — || align=right data-sort-value="0.76" | 760 m || 
|-id=732 bgcolor=#d6d6d6
| 331732 ||  || — || October 4, 2002 || Palomar || NEAT || EOS || align=right | 2.6 km || 
|-id=733 bgcolor=#fefefe
| 331733 ||  || — || October 4, 2002 || Anderson Mesa || LONEOS || — || align=right | 4.2 km || 
|-id=734 bgcolor=#d6d6d6
| 331734 ||  || — || October 5, 2002 || Palomar || NEAT || — || align=right | 4.2 km || 
|-id=735 bgcolor=#d6d6d6
| 331735 ||  || — || October 3, 2002 || Palomar || NEAT || — || align=right | 4.3 km || 
|-id=736 bgcolor=#d6d6d6
| 331736 ||  || — || October 4, 2002 || Socorro || LINEAR || — || align=right | 4.5 km || 
|-id=737 bgcolor=#fefefe
| 331737 ||  || — || October 8, 2002 || Kitt Peak || Spacewatch || — || align=right data-sort-value="0.85" | 850 m || 
|-id=738 bgcolor=#fefefe
| 331738 ||  || — || October 5, 2002 || Socorro || LINEAR || — || align=right | 1.2 km || 
|-id=739 bgcolor=#d6d6d6
| 331739 ||  || — || October 10, 2002 || Palomar || NEAT || THM || align=right | 3.2 km || 
|-id=740 bgcolor=#d6d6d6
| 331740 ||  || — || October 9, 2002 || Socorro || LINEAR || — || align=right | 3.5 km || 
|-id=741 bgcolor=#d6d6d6
| 331741 ||  || — || October 10, 2002 || Socorro || LINEAR || EOS || align=right | 3.1 km || 
|-id=742 bgcolor=#fefefe
| 331742 ||  || — || October 10, 2002 || Socorro || LINEAR || — || align=right | 1.3 km || 
|-id=743 bgcolor=#d6d6d6
| 331743 ||  || — || October 11, 2002 || Palomar || NEAT || — || align=right | 3.0 km || 
|-id=744 bgcolor=#fefefe
| 331744 ||  || — || October 4, 2002 || Apache Point || SDSS || FLO || align=right data-sort-value="0.66" | 660 m || 
|-id=745 bgcolor=#fefefe
| 331745 ||  || — || October 5, 2002 || Apache Point || SDSS || V || align=right data-sort-value="0.63" | 630 m || 
|-id=746 bgcolor=#fefefe
| 331746 ||  || — || October 10, 2002 || Apache Point || SDSS || FLO || align=right data-sort-value="0.51" | 510 m || 
|-id=747 bgcolor=#d6d6d6
| 331747 ||  || — || October 5, 2002 || Apache Point || SDSS || — || align=right | 4.7 km || 
|-id=748 bgcolor=#d6d6d6
| 331748 ||  || — || October 30, 2002 || Haleakala || NEAT || EUP || align=right | 7.0 km || 
|-id=749 bgcolor=#fefefe
| 331749 ||  || — || October 31, 2002 || Palomar || NEAT || — || align=right | 1.1 km || 
|-id=750 bgcolor=#fefefe
| 331750 ||  || — || October 6, 2002 || Socorro || LINEAR || H || align=right data-sort-value="0.69" | 690 m || 
|-id=751 bgcolor=#fefefe
| 331751 ||  || — || November 5, 2002 || Socorro || LINEAR || — || align=right | 2.2 km || 
|-id=752 bgcolor=#fefefe
| 331752 ||  || — || November 6, 2002 || Anderson Mesa || LONEOS || — || align=right data-sort-value="0.89" | 890 m || 
|-id=753 bgcolor=#d6d6d6
| 331753 ||  || — || November 12, 2002 || Palomar || NEAT || EOS || align=right | 3.0 km || 
|-id=754 bgcolor=#fefefe
| 331754 ||  || — || November 14, 2002 || Socorro || LINEAR || — || align=right | 1.1 km || 
|-id=755 bgcolor=#fefefe
| 331755 ||  || — || November 4, 2002 || Palomar || NEAT || MAS || align=right data-sort-value="0.70" | 700 m || 
|-id=756 bgcolor=#d6d6d6
| 331756 ||  || — || February 18, 2004 || Kitt Peak || Spacewatch || — || align=right | 3.2 km || 
|-id=757 bgcolor=#d6d6d6
| 331757 ||  || — || November 24, 2002 || Palomar || NEAT || Tj (2.99) || align=right | 6.9 km || 
|-id=758 bgcolor=#fefefe
| 331758 ||  || — || November 24, 2002 || Palomar || NEAT || — || align=right | 1.0 km || 
|-id=759 bgcolor=#fefefe
| 331759 ||  || — || December 2, 2002 || Socorro || LINEAR || — || align=right | 3.3 km || 
|-id=760 bgcolor=#fefefe
| 331760 ||  || — || December 5, 2002 || Socorro || LINEAR || MAS || align=right data-sort-value="0.80" | 800 m || 
|-id=761 bgcolor=#d6d6d6
| 331761 ||  || — || December 6, 2002 || Socorro || LINEAR || TIR || align=right | 4.8 km || 
|-id=762 bgcolor=#fefefe
| 331762 ||  || — || November 12, 2002 || Socorro || LINEAR || H || align=right data-sort-value="0.55" | 550 m || 
|-id=763 bgcolor=#E9E9E9
| 331763 ||  || — || December 11, 2002 || Socorro || LINEAR || — || align=right | 1.6 km || 
|-id=764 bgcolor=#fefefe
| 331764 ||  || — || December 5, 2002 || Socorro || LINEAR || — || align=right | 1.1 km || 
|-id=765 bgcolor=#d6d6d6
| 331765 ||  || — || December 10, 2002 || Palomar || NEAT || — || align=right | 3.2 km || 
|-id=766 bgcolor=#E9E9E9
| 331766 ||  || — || December 30, 2002 || Socorro || LINEAR || — || align=right | 2.4 km || 
|-id=767 bgcolor=#fefefe
| 331767 ||  || — || December 31, 2002 || Socorro || LINEAR || V || align=right data-sort-value="0.99" | 990 m || 
|-id=768 bgcolor=#E9E9E9
| 331768 ||  || — || January 26, 2003 || Anderson Mesa || LONEOS || BAR || align=right | 1.3 km || 
|-id=769 bgcolor=#FFC2E0
| 331769 ||  || — || January 26, 2003 || Kitt Peak || Spacewatch || AMO || align=right data-sort-value="0.37" | 370 m || 
|-id=770 bgcolor=#fefefe
| 331770 ||  || — || January 27, 2003 || Socorro || LINEAR || — || align=right | 1.00 km || 
|-id=771 bgcolor=#E9E9E9
| 331771 ||  || — || February 2, 2003 || Goodricke-Pigott || J. W. Kessel || — || align=right | 1.4 km || 
|-id=772 bgcolor=#E9E9E9
| 331772 ||  || — || February 26, 2003 || Campo Imperatore || CINEOS || GER || align=right | 1.5 km || 
|-id=773 bgcolor=#E9E9E9
| 331773 ||  || — || March 7, 2003 || Palomar || NEAT || — || align=right | 1.7 km || 
|-id=774 bgcolor=#E9E9E9
| 331774 ||  || — || March 8, 2003 || Anderson Mesa || LONEOS || — || align=right | 3.5 km || 
|-id=775 bgcolor=#E9E9E9
| 331775 ||  || — || March 8, 2003 || Socorro || LINEAR || — || align=right | 2.1 km || 
|-id=776 bgcolor=#E9E9E9
| 331776 ||  || — || February 4, 2003 || Palomar || NEAT || — || align=right | 1.4 km || 
|-id=777 bgcolor=#E9E9E9
| 331777 ||  || — || March 12, 2003 || Socorro || LINEAR || — || align=right | 2.8 km || 
|-id=778 bgcolor=#E9E9E9
| 331778 ||  || — || March 10, 2003 || Socorro || LINEAR || — || align=right | 2.5 km || 
|-id=779 bgcolor=#E9E9E9
| 331779 ||  || — || March 25, 2003 || Palomar || NEAT || RAF || align=right | 1.1 km || 
|-id=780 bgcolor=#E9E9E9
| 331780 ||  || — || March 23, 2003 || Kitt Peak || Spacewatch || — || align=right | 1.1 km || 
|-id=781 bgcolor=#E9E9E9
| 331781 ||  || — || March 27, 2003 || Kitt Peak || Spacewatch || JUN || align=right | 1.5 km || 
|-id=782 bgcolor=#E9E9E9
| 331782 ||  || — || April 9, 2003 || Socorro || LINEAR || — || align=right | 2.5 km || 
|-id=783 bgcolor=#E9E9E9
| 331783 ||  || — || April 9, 2003 || Socorro || LINEAR || JUN || align=right | 1.4 km || 
|-id=784 bgcolor=#E9E9E9
| 331784 ||  || — || April 11, 2003 || Kitt Peak || Spacewatch || — || align=right | 1.8 km || 
|-id=785 bgcolor=#FA8072
| 331785 Sumners ||  ||  || April 26, 2003 || Needville || D. Beaver, J. Dellinger || — || align=right | 2.1 km || 
|-id=786 bgcolor=#E9E9E9
| 331786 ||  || — || April 28, 2003 || Anderson Mesa || LONEOS || EUN || align=right | 1.9 km || 
|-id=787 bgcolor=#E9E9E9
| 331787 ||  || — || May 2, 2003 || Kitt Peak || Spacewatch || — || align=right | 2.2 km || 
|-id=788 bgcolor=#E9E9E9
| 331788 ||  || — || May 7, 2003 || Catalina || CSS || JUN || align=right | 1.3 km || 
|-id=789 bgcolor=#E9E9E9
| 331789 ||  || — || May 25, 2003 || Kitt Peak || Spacewatch || EUN || align=right | 1.5 km || 
|-id=790 bgcolor=#E9E9E9
| 331790 ||  || — || May 30, 2003 || Socorro || LINEAR || GER || align=right | 2.6 km || 
|-id=791 bgcolor=#E9E9E9
| 331791 ||  || — || June 5, 2003 || Kitt Peak || Spacewatch || WIT || align=right | 1.3 km || 
|-id=792 bgcolor=#FFC2E0
| 331792 ||  || — || June 25, 2003 || Socorro || LINEAR || AMO +1km || align=right | 1.3 km || 
|-id=793 bgcolor=#E9E9E9
| 331793 ||  || — || June 26, 2003 || Socorro || LINEAR || — || align=right | 3.0 km || 
|-id=794 bgcolor=#E9E9E9
| 331794 ||  || — || June 26, 2003 || Haleakala || NEAT || — || align=right | 3.5 km || 
|-id=795 bgcolor=#E9E9E9
| 331795 ||  || — || June 29, 2003 || Socorro || LINEAR || — || align=right | 2.5 km || 
|-id=796 bgcolor=#E9E9E9
| 331796 ||  || — || July 22, 2003 || Haleakala || NEAT || — || align=right | 4.2 km || 
|-id=797 bgcolor=#fefefe
| 331797 ||  || — || July 28, 2003 || Reedy Creek || J. Broughton || NYS || align=right data-sort-value="0.77" | 770 m || 
|-id=798 bgcolor=#fefefe
| 331798 ||  || — || August 21, 2003 || Palomar || NEAT || — || align=right data-sort-value="0.94" | 940 m || 
|-id=799 bgcolor=#E9E9E9
| 331799 ||  || — || August 23, 2003 || Palomar || NEAT || — || align=right | 2.8 km || 
|-id=800 bgcolor=#E9E9E9
| 331800 ||  || — || August 22, 2003 || Socorro || LINEAR || — || align=right | 2.8 km || 
|}

331801–331900 

|-bgcolor=#fefefe
| 331801 ||  || — || August 31, 2003 || Socorro || LINEAR || — || align=right | 1.2 km || 
|-id=802 bgcolor=#E9E9E9
| 331802 ||  || — || August 28, 2003 || Palomar || NEAT || — || align=right | 3.5 km || 
|-id=803 bgcolor=#E9E9E9
| 331803 ||  || — || September 14, 2003 || Haleakala || NEAT || GEF || align=right | 2.1 km || 
|-id=804 bgcolor=#fefefe
| 331804 ||  || — || September 14, 2003 || Haleakala || NEAT || FLO || align=right data-sort-value="0.65" | 650 m || 
|-id=805 bgcolor=#E9E9E9
| 331805 ||  || — || September 17, 2003 || Kitt Peak || Spacewatch || MRX || align=right | 1.2 km || 
|-id=806 bgcolor=#d6d6d6
| 331806 ||  || — || September 15, 2003 || Anderson Mesa || LONEOS || ALA || align=right | 4.5 km || 
|-id=807 bgcolor=#E9E9E9
| 331807 ||  || — || September 16, 2003 || Kitt Peak || Spacewatch || MRX || align=right | 1.3 km || 
|-id=808 bgcolor=#d6d6d6
| 331808 ||  || — || September 18, 2003 || Palomar || NEAT || — || align=right | 3.1 km || 
|-id=809 bgcolor=#E9E9E9
| 331809 ||  || — || September 18, 2003 || Kitt Peak || Spacewatch || DOR || align=right | 2.7 km || 
|-id=810 bgcolor=#d6d6d6
| 331810 ||  || — || September 18, 2003 || Kitt Peak || Spacewatch || — || align=right | 3.4 km || 
|-id=811 bgcolor=#FA8072
| 331811 ||  || — || September 19, 2003 || Haleakala || NEAT || — || align=right | 3.3 km || 
|-id=812 bgcolor=#d6d6d6
| 331812 ||  || — || September 20, 2003 || Kitt Peak || Spacewatch || — || align=right | 4.2 km || 
|-id=813 bgcolor=#d6d6d6
| 331813 ||  || — || September 19, 2003 || Kitt Peak || Spacewatch || — || align=right | 4.1 km || 
|-id=814 bgcolor=#d6d6d6
| 331814 ||  || — || September 20, 2003 || Palomar || NEAT || — || align=right | 3.0 km || 
|-id=815 bgcolor=#d6d6d6
| 331815 ||  || — || September 26, 2003 || Socorro || LINEAR || — || align=right | 3.4 km || 
|-id=816 bgcolor=#d6d6d6
| 331816 ||  || — || September 19, 2003 || Anderson Mesa || LONEOS || — || align=right | 4.3 km || 
|-id=817 bgcolor=#d6d6d6
| 331817 ||  || — || September 21, 2003 || Palomar || NEAT || — || align=right | 2.2 km || 
|-id=818 bgcolor=#d6d6d6
| 331818 ||  || — || September 25, 2003 || Palomar || NEAT || — || align=right | 3.8 km || 
|-id=819 bgcolor=#d6d6d6
| 331819 ||  || — || September 30, 2003 || Socorro || LINEAR || EOS || align=right | 3.3 km || 
|-id=820 bgcolor=#E9E9E9
| 331820 ||  || — || September 17, 2003 || Kitt Peak || Spacewatch || HNA || align=right | 2.6 km || 
|-id=821 bgcolor=#fefefe
| 331821 ||  || — || April 9, 2006 || Kitt Peak || Spacewatch || MAS || align=right data-sort-value="0.82" | 820 m || 
|-id=822 bgcolor=#fefefe
| 331822 ||  || — || September 26, 2003 || Apache Point || SDSS || — || align=right data-sort-value="0.87" | 870 m || 
|-id=823 bgcolor=#d6d6d6
| 331823 ||  || — || September 27, 2003 || Apache Point || SDSS || — || align=right | 3.8 km || 
|-id=824 bgcolor=#d6d6d6
| 331824 ||  || — || September 25, 2003 || Mauna Kea || P. A. Wiegert || KAR || align=right | 1.2 km || 
|-id=825 bgcolor=#d6d6d6
| 331825 ||  || — || October 1, 2003 || Kitt Peak || Spacewatch || — || align=right | 3.4 km || 
|-id=826 bgcolor=#d6d6d6
| 331826 ||  || — || October 15, 2003 || Needville || Needville Obs. || — || align=right | 4.0 km || 
|-id=827 bgcolor=#d6d6d6
| 331827 ||  || — || October 15, 2003 || Anderson Mesa || LONEOS || — || align=right | 3.0 km || 
|-id=828 bgcolor=#d6d6d6
| 331828 ||  || — || October 2, 2003 || Kitt Peak || Spacewatch || — || align=right | 3.4 km || 
|-id=829 bgcolor=#d6d6d6
| 331829 ||  || — || October 2, 2003 || Kitt Peak || Spacewatch || — || align=right | 3.1 km || 
|-id=830 bgcolor=#E9E9E9
| 331830 ||  || — || October 16, 2003 || Palomar || NEAT || — || align=right | 5.7 km || 
|-id=831 bgcolor=#d6d6d6
| 331831 ||  || — || October 16, 2003 || Kitt Peak || Spacewatch || — || align=right | 3.5 km || 
|-id=832 bgcolor=#fefefe
| 331832 ||  || — || October 22, 2003 || Haleakala || NEAT || — || align=right data-sort-value="0.91" | 910 m || 
|-id=833 bgcolor=#d6d6d6
| 331833 ||  || — || October 1, 2003 || Kitt Peak || Spacewatch || — || align=right | 3.7 km || 
|-id=834 bgcolor=#E9E9E9
| 331834 ||  || — || October 21, 2003 || Goodricke-Pigott || R. A. Tucker || CLO || align=right | 3.4 km || 
|-id=835 bgcolor=#d6d6d6
| 331835 ||  || — || October 22, 2003 || Socorro || LINEAR || — || align=right | 4.0 km || 
|-id=836 bgcolor=#d6d6d6
| 331836 ||  || — || October 19, 2003 || Kitt Peak || Spacewatch || — || align=right | 2.8 km || 
|-id=837 bgcolor=#d6d6d6
| 331837 ||  || — || October 20, 2003 || Palomar || NEAT || EOS || align=right | 2.8 km || 
|-id=838 bgcolor=#d6d6d6
| 331838 ||  || — || October 18, 2003 || Haleakala || NEAT || — || align=right | 3.9 km || 
|-id=839 bgcolor=#d6d6d6
| 331839 ||  || — || September 27, 2003 || Kitt Peak || Spacewatch || — || align=right | 3.4 km || 
|-id=840 bgcolor=#fefefe
| 331840 ||  || — || October 20, 2003 || Kitt Peak || Spacewatch || — || align=right data-sort-value="0.67" | 670 m || 
|-id=841 bgcolor=#d6d6d6
| 331841 ||  || — || October 21, 2003 || Kitt Peak || Spacewatch || EOS || align=right | 2.0 km || 
|-id=842 bgcolor=#d6d6d6
| 331842 ||  || — || October 21, 2003 || Kitt Peak || Spacewatch || ALA || align=right | 5.8 km || 
|-id=843 bgcolor=#fefefe
| 331843 ||  || — || October 21, 2003 || Kitt Peak || Spacewatch || — || align=right data-sort-value="0.87" | 870 m || 
|-id=844 bgcolor=#d6d6d6
| 331844 ||  || — || October 21, 2003 || Socorro || LINEAR || TIR || align=right | 3.5 km || 
|-id=845 bgcolor=#d6d6d6
| 331845 ||  || — || October 23, 2003 || Kitt Peak || Spacewatch || — || align=right | 4.2 km || 
|-id=846 bgcolor=#d6d6d6
| 331846 ||  || — || October 24, 2003 || Socorro || LINEAR || CRO || align=right | 4.2 km || 
|-id=847 bgcolor=#d6d6d6
| 331847 ||  || — || October 25, 2003 || Socorro || LINEAR || — || align=right | 6.5 km || 
|-id=848 bgcolor=#FA8072
| 331848 ||  || — || October 26, 2003 || Kitt Peak || Spacewatch || — || align=right data-sort-value="0.83" | 830 m || 
|-id=849 bgcolor=#d6d6d6
| 331849 ||  || — || October 29, 2003 || Socorro || LINEAR || EOS || align=right | 3.2 km || 
|-id=850 bgcolor=#fefefe
| 331850 ||  || — || October 27, 2003 || Socorro || LINEAR || PHO || align=right | 1.4 km || 
|-id=851 bgcolor=#d6d6d6
| 331851 ||  || — || October 30, 2003 || Socorro || LINEAR || EOS || align=right | 3.0 km || 
|-id=852 bgcolor=#d6d6d6
| 331852 ||  || — || October 18, 2003 || Apache Point || SDSS || — || align=right | 2.8 km || 
|-id=853 bgcolor=#d6d6d6
| 331853 ||  || — || October 19, 2003 || Kitt Peak || Spacewatch || — || align=right | 3.4 km || 
|-id=854 bgcolor=#d6d6d6
| 331854 ||  || — || November 15, 2003 || Kitt Peak || Spacewatch || VER || align=right | 5.3 km || 
|-id=855 bgcolor=#d6d6d6
| 331855 ||  || — || October 2, 2003 || Kitt Peak || Spacewatch || — || align=right | 3.2 km || 
|-id=856 bgcolor=#d6d6d6
| 331856 ||  || — || November 16, 2003 || Catalina || CSS || — || align=right | 3.2 km || 
|-id=857 bgcolor=#FA8072
| 331857 ||  || — || November 18, 2003 || Socorro || LINEAR || — || align=right | 4.9 km || 
|-id=858 bgcolor=#fefefe
| 331858 ||  || — || November 19, 2003 || Kitt Peak || Spacewatch || FLO || align=right data-sort-value="0.78" | 780 m || 
|-id=859 bgcolor=#d6d6d6
| 331859 ||  || — || November 20, 2003 || Socorro || LINEAR || EOS || align=right | 2.6 km || 
|-id=860 bgcolor=#fefefe
| 331860 ||  || — || November 21, 2003 || Socorro || LINEAR || — || align=right data-sort-value="0.97" | 970 m || 
|-id=861 bgcolor=#d6d6d6
| 331861 ||  || — || November 24, 2003 || Kitt Peak || Spacewatch || HYG || align=right | 3.0 km || 
|-id=862 bgcolor=#d6d6d6
| 331862 ||  || — || November 20, 2003 || Kitt Peak || Spacewatch || — || align=right | 3.0 km || 
|-id=863 bgcolor=#d6d6d6
| 331863 ||  || — || December 13, 2003 || Socorro || LINEAR || ALA || align=right | 5.2 km || 
|-id=864 bgcolor=#fefefe
| 331864 ||  || — || December 19, 2003 || Socorro || LINEAR || NYS || align=right data-sort-value="0.70" | 700 m || 
|-id=865 bgcolor=#d6d6d6
| 331865 ||  || — || December 19, 2003 || Socorro || LINEAR || — || align=right | 5.3 km || 
|-id=866 bgcolor=#d6d6d6
| 331866 ||  || — || December 18, 2003 || Socorro || LINEAR || EOS || align=right | 2.6 km || 
|-id=867 bgcolor=#d6d6d6
| 331867 ||  || — || December 21, 2003 || Socorro || LINEAR || — || align=right | 3.6 km || 
|-id=868 bgcolor=#d6d6d6
| 331868 ||  || — || December 22, 2003 || Kitt Peak || Spacewatch || — || align=right | 4.0 km || 
|-id=869 bgcolor=#d6d6d6
| 331869 ||  || — || December 17, 2003 || Socorro || LINEAR || — || align=right | 4.4 km || 
|-id=870 bgcolor=#fefefe
| 331870 ||  || — || December 18, 2003 || Socorro || LINEAR || — || align=right data-sort-value="0.86" | 860 m || 
|-id=871 bgcolor=#fefefe
| 331871 ||  || — || December 17, 2003 || Kitt Peak || Spacewatch || FLO || align=right data-sort-value="0.58" | 580 m || 
|-id=872 bgcolor=#d6d6d6
| 331872 ||  || — || January 17, 2004 || Kitt Peak || Spacewatch || — || align=right | 5.3 km || 
|-id=873 bgcolor=#d6d6d6
| 331873 ||  || — || January 19, 2004 || Kitt Peak || Spacewatch || — || align=right | 4.2 km || 
|-id=874 bgcolor=#fefefe
| 331874 ||  || — || January 19, 2004 || Kitt Peak || Spacewatch || NYS || align=right data-sort-value="0.51" | 510 m || 
|-id=875 bgcolor=#fefefe
| 331875 ||  || — || January 19, 2004 || Kitt Peak || Spacewatch || — || align=right data-sort-value="0.97" | 970 m || 
|-id=876 bgcolor=#FFC2E0
| 331876 ||  || — || February 7, 2004 || Anderson Mesa || LONEOS || APOPHA || align=right data-sort-value="0.29" | 290 m || 
|-id=877 bgcolor=#fefefe
| 331877 ||  || — || February 10, 2004 || Palomar || NEAT || — || align=right data-sort-value="0.97" | 970 m || 
|-id=878 bgcolor=#fefefe
| 331878 ||  || — || February 11, 2004 || Palomar || NEAT || V || align=right data-sort-value="0.90" | 900 m || 
|-id=879 bgcolor=#d6d6d6
| 331879 ||  || — || February 12, 2004 || Kitt Peak || Spacewatch || — || align=right | 4.1 km || 
|-id=880 bgcolor=#fefefe
| 331880 ||  || — || February 12, 2004 || Kitt Peak || Spacewatch || — || align=right data-sort-value="0.91" | 910 m || 
|-id=881 bgcolor=#E9E9E9
| 331881 ||  || — || February 11, 2004 || Kitt Peak || Spacewatch || — || align=right data-sort-value="0.89" | 890 m || 
|-id=882 bgcolor=#d6d6d6
| 331882 ||  || — || February 12, 2004 || Kitt Peak || Spacewatch || 7:4 || align=right | 5.0 km || 
|-id=883 bgcolor=#E9E9E9
| 331883 ||  || — || February 19, 2004 || Socorro || LINEAR || — || align=right | 2.2 km || 
|-id=884 bgcolor=#E9E9E9
| 331884 ||  || — || March 10, 2004 || Palomar || NEAT || INO || align=right | 1.5 km || 
|-id=885 bgcolor=#fefefe
| 331885 ||  || — || March 12, 2004 || Palomar || NEAT || — || align=right data-sort-value="0.87" | 870 m || 
|-id=886 bgcolor=#fefefe
| 331886 ||  || — || March 15, 2004 || Catalina || CSS || — || align=right | 1.1 km || 
|-id=887 bgcolor=#fefefe
| 331887 ||  || — || March 15, 2004 || Kitt Peak || Spacewatch || MAS || align=right data-sort-value="0.85" | 850 m || 
|-id=888 bgcolor=#fefefe
| 331888 ||  || — || March 15, 2004 || Palomar || NEAT || — || align=right | 1.0 km || 
|-id=889 bgcolor=#E9E9E9
| 331889 ||  || — || March 27, 2004 || Socorro || LINEAR || ADE || align=right | 2.6 km || 
|-id=890 bgcolor=#E9E9E9
| 331890 ||  || — || April 12, 2004 || Socorro || LINEAR || — || align=right | 3.0 km || 
|-id=891 bgcolor=#fefefe
| 331891 ||  || — || April 15, 2004 || Palomar || NEAT || — || align=right | 1.3 km || 
|-id=892 bgcolor=#E9E9E9
| 331892 ||  || — || May 13, 2004 || Socorro || LINEAR || — || align=right | 1.4 km || 
|-id=893 bgcolor=#fefefe
| 331893 ||  || — || May 13, 2004 || Kitt Peak || Spacewatch || — || align=right | 1.1 km || 
|-id=894 bgcolor=#E9E9E9
| 331894 ||  || — || June 8, 2004 || Goodricke-Pigott || R. A. Tucker || JUN || align=right | 1.2 km || 
|-id=895 bgcolor=#E9E9E9
| 331895 ||  || — || July 7, 2004 || Campo Imperatore || CINEOS || — || align=right | 1.9 km || 
|-id=896 bgcolor=#E9E9E9
| 331896 ||  || — || July 14, 2004 || Siding Spring || SSS || EUN || align=right | 1.6 km || 
|-id=897 bgcolor=#E9E9E9
| 331897 ||  || — || August 9, 2004 || Socorro || LINEAR || EUN || align=right | 1.6 km || 
|-id=898 bgcolor=#E9E9E9
| 331898 ||  || — || August 9, 2004 || Socorro || LINEAR || — || align=right | 1.6 km || 
|-id=899 bgcolor=#E9E9E9
| 331899 ||  || — || August 8, 2004 || Socorro || LINEAR || ADE || align=right | 2.2 km || 
|-id=900 bgcolor=#E9E9E9
| 331900 ||  || — || August 9, 2004 || Socorro || LINEAR || — || align=right | 1.0 km || 
|}

331901–332000 

|-bgcolor=#E9E9E9
| 331901 ||  || — || August 9, 2004 || Socorro || LINEAR || — || align=right | 2.7 km || 
|-id=902 bgcolor=#E9E9E9
| 331902 ||  || — || August 11, 2004 || Socorro || LINEAR || — || align=right | 1.3 km || 
|-id=903 bgcolor=#E9E9E9
| 331903 ||  || — || August 9, 2004 || Socorro || LINEAR || EUN || align=right | 1.8 km || 
|-id=904 bgcolor=#fefefe
| 331904 ||  || — || September 6, 2004 || Socorro || LINEAR || H || align=right data-sort-value="0.65" | 650 m || 
|-id=905 bgcolor=#E9E9E9
| 331905 ||  || — || September 6, 2004 || Palomar || NEAT || — || align=right | 2.0 km || 
|-id=906 bgcolor=#E9E9E9
| 331906 ||  || — || September 7, 2004 || Kleť || Kleť Obs. || — || align=right | 1.8 km || 
|-id=907 bgcolor=#E9E9E9
| 331907 ||  || — || September 7, 2004 || Socorro || LINEAR || — || align=right | 1.6 km || 
|-id=908 bgcolor=#E9E9E9
| 331908 ||  || — || September 7, 2004 || Socorro || LINEAR || — || align=right | 1.4 km || 
|-id=909 bgcolor=#E9E9E9
| 331909 ||  || — || September 8, 2004 || Socorro || LINEAR || — || align=right | 1.9 km || 
|-id=910 bgcolor=#E9E9E9
| 331910 ||  || — || September 8, 2004 || Socorro || LINEAR || — || align=right | 2.2 km || 
|-id=911 bgcolor=#E9E9E9
| 331911 ||  || — || September 8, 2004 || Socorro || LINEAR || — || align=right | 3.2 km || 
|-id=912 bgcolor=#E9E9E9
| 331912 ||  || — || September 7, 2004 || Palomar || NEAT || — || align=right | 1.8 km || 
|-id=913 bgcolor=#E9E9E9
| 331913 ||  || — || September 10, 2004 || Socorro || LINEAR || — || align=right | 3.3 km || 
|-id=914 bgcolor=#E9E9E9
| 331914 ||  || — || September 7, 2004 || Socorro || LINEAR || — || align=right | 1.8 km || 
|-id=915 bgcolor=#E9E9E9
| 331915 ||  || — || September 8, 2004 || Socorro || LINEAR || — || align=right | 2.2 km || 
|-id=916 bgcolor=#E9E9E9
| 331916 ||  || — || September 8, 2004 || Palomar || NEAT || — || align=right | 3.8 km || 
|-id=917 bgcolor=#E9E9E9
| 331917 ||  || — || August 26, 2004 || Catalina || CSS || BAR || align=right | 1.5 km || 
|-id=918 bgcolor=#E9E9E9
| 331918 ||  || — || September 10, 2004 || Socorro || LINEAR || JUN || align=right | 1.3 km || 
|-id=919 bgcolor=#E9E9E9
| 331919 ||  || — || September 10, 2004 || Socorro || LINEAR || — || align=right | 1.5 km || 
|-id=920 bgcolor=#E9E9E9
| 331920 ||  || — || September 10, 2004 || Socorro || LINEAR || — || align=right | 2.8 km || 
|-id=921 bgcolor=#E9E9E9
| 331921 ||  || — || September 10, 2004 || Kitt Peak || Spacewatch || — || align=right | 3.4 km || 
|-id=922 bgcolor=#E9E9E9
| 331922 ||  || — || September 11, 2004 || Socorro || LINEAR || EUN || align=right | 1.3 km || 
|-id=923 bgcolor=#E9E9E9
| 331923 ||  || — || September 10, 2004 || Kitt Peak || Spacewatch || HEN || align=right | 1.3 km || 
|-id=924 bgcolor=#E9E9E9
| 331924 ||  || — || September 11, 2004 || Kitt Peak || Spacewatch || — || align=right | 1.3 km || 
|-id=925 bgcolor=#E9E9E9
| 331925 ||  || — || September 13, 2004 || Socorro || LINEAR || RAF || align=right | 1.2 km || 
|-id=926 bgcolor=#E9E9E9
| 331926 ||  || — || September 14, 2004 || Socorro || LINEAR || — || align=right | 3.4 km || 
|-id=927 bgcolor=#E9E9E9
| 331927 ||  || — || September 14, 2004 || Socorro || LINEAR || — || align=right | 4.2 km || 
|-id=928 bgcolor=#E9E9E9
| 331928 ||  || — || September 17, 2004 || Anderson Mesa || LONEOS || JUN || align=right data-sort-value="0.97" | 970 m || 
|-id=929 bgcolor=#E9E9E9
| 331929 ||  || — || September 21, 2004 || Kitt Peak || Spacewatch || — || align=right | 1.6 km || 
|-id=930 bgcolor=#E9E9E9
| 331930 ||  || — || September 17, 2004 || Kitt Peak || Spacewatch || — || align=right | 2.9 km || 
|-id=931 bgcolor=#E9E9E9
| 331931 ||  || — || September 18, 2004 || Socorro || LINEAR || — || align=right | 2.7 km || 
|-id=932 bgcolor=#E9E9E9
| 331932 ||  || — || September 17, 2004 || Socorro || LINEAR || — || align=right | 2.0 km || 
|-id=933 bgcolor=#fefefe
| 331933 ||  || — || October 8, 2004 || Socorro || LINEAR || H || align=right data-sort-value="0.70" | 700 m || 
|-id=934 bgcolor=#E9E9E9
| 331934 ||  || — || October 4, 2004 || Kitt Peak || Spacewatch || EUN || align=right | 1.6 km || 
|-id=935 bgcolor=#E9E9E9
| 331935 ||  || — || October 4, 2004 || Kitt Peak || Spacewatch || HEN || align=right | 1.0 km || 
|-id=936 bgcolor=#E9E9E9
| 331936 ||  || — || October 4, 2004 || Kitt Peak || Spacewatch || INO || align=right | 1.2 km || 
|-id=937 bgcolor=#E9E9E9
| 331937 ||  || — || October 4, 2004 || Kitt Peak || Spacewatch || — || align=right | 3.4 km || 
|-id=938 bgcolor=#E9E9E9
| 331938 ||  || — || October 4, 2004 || Kitt Peak || Spacewatch || JUN || align=right | 1.1 km || 
|-id=939 bgcolor=#d6d6d6
| 331939 ||  || — || September 22, 2004 || Socorro || LINEAR || — || align=right | 3.4 km || 
|-id=940 bgcolor=#E9E9E9
| 331940 ||  || — || October 6, 2004 || Socorro || LINEAR || — || align=right | 1.5 km || 
|-id=941 bgcolor=#E9E9E9
| 331941 ||  || — || October 7, 2004 || Anderson Mesa || LONEOS || — || align=right | 1.4 km || 
|-id=942 bgcolor=#E9E9E9
| 331942 ||  || — || October 6, 2004 || Kitt Peak || Spacewatch || MRX || align=right | 1.4 km || 
|-id=943 bgcolor=#E9E9E9
| 331943 ||  || — || October 7, 2004 || Kitt Peak || Spacewatch || HOF || align=right | 2.5 km || 
|-id=944 bgcolor=#E9E9E9
| 331944 ||  || — || October 7, 2004 || Kitt Peak || Spacewatch || — || align=right | 2.4 km || 
|-id=945 bgcolor=#d6d6d6
| 331945 ||  || — || October 8, 2004 || Kitt Peak || Spacewatch || KOR || align=right | 1.3 km || 
|-id=946 bgcolor=#E9E9E9
| 331946 ||  || — || October 6, 2004 || Palomar || NEAT || — || align=right | 2.5 km || 
|-id=947 bgcolor=#E9E9E9
| 331947 ||  || — || October 9, 2004 || Kitt Peak || Spacewatch || MRX || align=right | 1.4 km || 
|-id=948 bgcolor=#E9E9E9
| 331948 ||  || — || October 9, 2004 || Kitt Peak || Spacewatch || — || align=right | 2.7 km || 
|-id=949 bgcolor=#E9E9E9
| 331949 ||  || — || October 8, 2004 || Socorro || LINEAR || — || align=right | 3.2 km || 
|-id=950 bgcolor=#d6d6d6
| 331950 ||  || — || October 4, 2004 || Palomar || NEAT || — || align=right | 3.9 km || 
|-id=951 bgcolor=#E9E9E9
| 331951 ||  || — || October 13, 2004 || Kitt Peak || Spacewatch || — || align=right | 3.8 km || 
|-id=952 bgcolor=#E9E9E9
| 331952 ||  || — || October 7, 2004 || Socorro || LINEAR || — || align=right | 3.6 km || 
|-id=953 bgcolor=#E9E9E9
| 331953 ||  || — || October 9, 2004 || Kitt Peak || Spacewatch || — || align=right | 3.2 km || 
|-id=954 bgcolor=#E9E9E9
| 331954 ||  || — || October 19, 2004 || Socorro || LINEAR || — || align=right | 3.5 km || 
|-id=955 bgcolor=#E9E9E9
| 331955 ||  || — || November 3, 2004 || Anderson Mesa || LONEOS || EUN || align=right | 1.8 km || 
|-id=956 bgcolor=#d6d6d6
| 331956 ||  || — || November 3, 2004 || Catalina || CSS || TIR || align=right | 3.8 km || 
|-id=957 bgcolor=#d6d6d6
| 331957 ||  || — || November 4, 2004 || Kitt Peak || Spacewatch || KOR || align=right | 1.5 km || 
|-id=958 bgcolor=#fefefe
| 331958 ||  || — || November 4, 2004 || Kitt Peak || Spacewatch || — || align=right data-sort-value="0.83" | 830 m || 
|-id=959 bgcolor=#E9E9E9
| 331959 ||  || — || November 13, 2004 || Goodricke-Pigott || Goodricke-Pigott Obs. || — || align=right | 3.2 km || 
|-id=960 bgcolor=#E9E9E9
| 331960 ||  || — || November 10, 2004 || Kitt Peak || Spacewatch || — || align=right | 3.5 km || 
|-id=961 bgcolor=#d6d6d6
| 331961 ||  || — || December 10, 2004 || Kitt Peak || Spacewatch || EOS || align=right | 3.0 km || 
|-id=962 bgcolor=#d6d6d6
| 331962 ||  || — || December 11, 2004 || Campo Imperatore || CINEOS || — || align=right | 3.4 km || 
|-id=963 bgcolor=#FFC2E0
| 331963 ||  || — || December 11, 2004 || Socorro || LINEAR || AMO +1km || align=right | 1.1 km || 
|-id=964 bgcolor=#d6d6d6
| 331964 ||  || — || December 11, 2004 || Kitt Peak || Spacewatch || TEL || align=right | 1.9 km || 
|-id=965 bgcolor=#d6d6d6
| 331965 ||  || — || December 11, 2004 || Junk Bond || Junk Bond Obs. || — || align=right | 3.5 km || 
|-id=966 bgcolor=#E9E9E9
| 331966 ||  || — || December 10, 2004 || Kitt Peak || Spacewatch || — || align=right | 2.5 km || 
|-id=967 bgcolor=#d6d6d6
| 331967 ||  || — || December 11, 2004 || Catalina || CSS || BRA || align=right | 1.8 km || 
|-id=968 bgcolor=#E9E9E9
| 331968 ||  || — || December 11, 2004 || Kitt Peak || Spacewatch || — || align=right | 2.7 km || 
|-id=969 bgcolor=#E9E9E9
| 331969 ||  || — || December 12, 2004 || Kitt Peak || Spacewatch || GEF || align=right | 1.7 km || 
|-id=970 bgcolor=#E9E9E9
| 331970 ||  || — || December 18, 2004 || Mount Lemmon || Mount Lemmon Survey || — || align=right | 1.5 km || 
|-id=971 bgcolor=#d6d6d6
| 331971 ||  || — || January 13, 2005 || Kitt Peak || Spacewatch || — || align=right | 3.7 km || 
|-id=972 bgcolor=#d6d6d6
| 331972 ||  || — || January 13, 2005 || Kitt Peak || Spacewatch || — || align=right | 2.6 km || 
|-id=973 bgcolor=#d6d6d6
| 331973 ||  || — || January 15, 2005 || Kitt Peak || Spacewatch || HYG || align=right | 3.3 km || 
|-id=974 bgcolor=#d6d6d6
| 331974 ||  || — || February 1, 2005 || Kitt Peak || Spacewatch || — || align=right | 2.9 km || 
|-id=975 bgcolor=#d6d6d6
| 331975 ||  || — || February 1, 2005 || Kitt Peak || Spacewatch || — || align=right | 4.0 km || 
|-id=976 bgcolor=#fefefe
| 331976 ||  || — || February 2, 2005 || Kitt Peak || Spacewatch || — || align=right data-sort-value="0.79" | 790 m || 
|-id=977 bgcolor=#d6d6d6
| 331977 ||  || — || February 14, 2005 || Catalina || CSS || — || align=right | 4.3 km || 
|-id=978 bgcolor=#d6d6d6
| 331978 ||  || — || February 9, 2005 || Anderson Mesa || LONEOS || — || align=right | 5.9 km || 
|-id=979 bgcolor=#d6d6d6
| 331979 ||  || — || February 10, 2005 || Campo Imperatore || CINEOS || — || align=right | 3.7 km || 
|-id=980 bgcolor=#d6d6d6
| 331980 ||  || — || March 2, 2005 || Kitt Peak || Spacewatch || EOS || align=right | 3.1 km || 
|-id=981 bgcolor=#fefefe
| 331981 ||  || — || March 3, 2005 || Kitt Peak || Spacewatch || — || align=right data-sort-value="0.87" | 870 m || 
|-id=982 bgcolor=#d6d6d6
| 331982 ||  || — || March 2, 2005 || Socorro || LINEAR || Tj (2.99) || align=right | 6.1 km || 
|-id=983 bgcolor=#d6d6d6
| 331983 ||  || — || March 2, 2005 || Kitt Peak || Spacewatch || — || align=right | 3.2 km || 
|-id=984 bgcolor=#FA8072
| 331984 ||  || — || March 3, 2005 || Kitt Peak || Spacewatch || — || align=right data-sort-value="0.88" | 880 m || 
|-id=985 bgcolor=#fefefe
| 331985 ||  || — || March 10, 2005 || Kitt Peak || Spacewatch || FLO || align=right data-sort-value="0.71" | 710 m || 
|-id=986 bgcolor=#d6d6d6
| 331986 ||  || — || March 4, 2005 || Kitt Peak || Spacewatch || EUP || align=right | 3.9 km || 
|-id=987 bgcolor=#fefefe
| 331987 ||  || — || March 11, 2005 || Mount Lemmon || Mount Lemmon Survey || — || align=right data-sort-value="0.65" | 650 m || 
|-id=988 bgcolor=#d6d6d6
| 331988 ||  || — || March 13, 2005 || Mount Lemmon || Mount Lemmon Survey || — || align=right | 3.2 km || 
|-id=989 bgcolor=#fefefe
| 331989 ||  || — || March 10, 2005 || Catalina || CSS || — || align=right | 1.0 km || 
|-id=990 bgcolor=#FFC2E0
| 331990 ||  || — || March 16, 2005 || Catalina || CSS || APO || align=right data-sort-value="0.42" | 420 m || 
|-id=991 bgcolor=#FA8072
| 331991 ||  || — || March 21, 2005 || Socorro || LINEAR || — || align=right | 3.6 km || 
|-id=992 bgcolor=#fefefe
| 331992 Chasseral ||  ||  || April 3, 2005 || Vicques || M. Ory || FLO || align=right data-sort-value="0.67" | 670 m || 
|-id=993 bgcolor=#fefefe
| 331993 ||  || — || April 4, 2005 || Catalina || CSS || — || align=right | 1.2 km || 
|-id=994 bgcolor=#E9E9E9
| 331994 ||  || — || April 5, 2005 || Mount Lemmon || Mount Lemmon Survey || AST || align=right | 1.7 km || 
|-id=995 bgcolor=#fefefe
| 331995 ||  || — || April 10, 2005 || Siding Spring || SSS || — || align=right | 1.2 km || 
|-id=996 bgcolor=#E9E9E9
| 331996 ||  || — || April 14, 2005 || Kitt Peak || Spacewatch || MIT || align=right | 3.2 km || 
|-id=997 bgcolor=#fefefe
| 331997 ||  || — || April 14, 2005 || Kitt Peak || Spacewatch || — || align=right data-sort-value="0.66" | 660 m || 
|-id=998 bgcolor=#d6d6d6
| 331998 ||  || — || April 2, 2005 || Kitt Peak || Spacewatch || — || align=right | 3.3 km || 
|-id=999 bgcolor=#FFC2E0
| 331999 ||  || — || May 3, 2005 || Kitt Peak || Kitt Peak Obs. || AMO || align=right data-sort-value="0.51" | 510 m || 
|-id=000 bgcolor=#d6d6d6
| 332000 ||  || — || May 6, 2005 || Kitt Peak || Spacewatch || 7:4 || align=right | 5.1 km || 
|}

References

External links 
 Discovery Circumstances: Numbered Minor Planets (330001)–(335000) (IAU Minor Planet Center)

0331